= Treason Act =

United Kingdom and Ireland legislation

Treason Act or Treasons Act (and variations thereon) or Statute of Treasons is a stock short title used for legislation in the United Kingdom and in Ireland on the subject of treason and related offences.

Several Acts on the subject of treason may also have different short titles, such as the Sedition Act.

The Treason Acts may refer to all statutes with this short title or to all statutes on the subject of treason and related offences.

== Main acts in force ==
=== United Kingdom ===
- The Treason Act 1351 (25 Edw. 3. Stat. 5 c. 2) first provided a statutory definition of treason, which is mostly still in force. The Succession to the Crown Act 2013 (c. 20) amended two of the treasons to reduce gender inequality.
- The Treason Act 1495 (11 Hen. 7. c. 1) excludes acts done in support of a defeated claimant to the throne in a civil war from the scope of treason.
- The Treason Act (Ireland) 1537 (28 Hen. 8. c. 7 (I)), in force in Northern Ireland, expands the definition of treason.
- The Treason Act 1695 (7 & 8 Will. 3. c. 3) establishes a time limit for prosecutions for treason of three years, except in the case of assassinating or attempting to assassinate the monarch. The Treason (Ireland) Act 1821 (1 & 2 Geo. 4. c. 24) extends these provisions to Northern Ireland.
- The Treason Act 1702 (1 Ann. St. 2. c. 21) further extends the definition of treason.
- The Treason Act 1708 (7 Ann. c. 21) abolished the Scots law of treason and substituted the English law, and also made it treason to kill certain Scottish judges or counterfeit the Great Seal of Scotland (the latter is no longer treason except in Scotland).
- The Treason Act 1814 (54 Geo. 3. c. 146) specifies the penalty for treason; following abolition of the death penalty by the Crime and Disorder Act 1998 (c. 37), this is life imprisonment.
- The Treason Act 1842 (5 & 6 Vict. c. 51) creates an offence short of treason (originally a misdemeanour) of using weapons with intent to injure or alarm the monarch.
- The Treason Felony Act 1848 (11 & 12 Vict. c. 12) reduced certain treasons to the offence of 'treason felony'. Obiter dicta in a case related to treason felony suggests that the Human Rights Act 1998 (c. 42) has altered the proper interpretation of this offence.
- The Criminal Law Act 1967 (c. 58) specifies that the same trial procedure is to be used for treason as for murder. Before 1945, treason was subject to a different criminal procedure.
- Treason is an excepted matter in Northern Ireland under the Northern Ireland Act 1998 (c. 47), a reserved matter in Scotland under the Scotland Act 1998 (c. 46), and a listed category of offence under the Government of Wales Act 2006 (c. 32). The respective devolved legislatures have no power to legislate on these subjects.

== List ==
=== England ===
62 acts (1351–1705)
The Treason Act 1351 (25 Edw. 3. Stat. 5 c. 2)
The Forfeitures Act 1360 (34 Edw. 3. c. 12)
The Treason Act 1381 (5 Ric. 2 Stat. 1. c. 6)
The Treason Act 1397 (21 Ric. 2. c. 12)

See also cc. 2, 3, 4, 6, 7 and 20

The Treason Act 1399 (1 Hen. 4. c. 10) (repealed the Treason Acts 1381 and 1397)
The Safe Conducts Act 1414 (2 Hen. 5. Stat. 1. c. 6)
The Treason Act 1415 (3 Hen. 5. c. 6)

See also 3 Hen. 5. St. 2. c. 7

The Treason Act 1423 (2 Hen. 6. c. 21)
The Treason Act 1429 (8 Hen. 6. c. 6)
The Treason Act 1442 (20 Hen. 6. c. 3)

See also 20 Hen. 6. c. 11

The Treason Act 1448 (27 Hen. 6. c. 4)
The Act of Accord (1460) (39 Hen. 6. c. 1)
The Treason Act 1488 (4 Hen. 7. c. 18)
The Treason Act 1495 (11 Hen. 7. c. 1)
The Benefit of Clergy Act 1496 (12 Hen. 7. c. 7) (abolished benefit of clergy for petit treason)
The Poisoning Act 1530 (22 Hen. 8. c. 9)
The Treasons Act 1534 (26 Hen. 8. c. 13)
The Treason Act 1535 (27 Hen. 8. c. 2)
The Act of Succession 1536 (28 Hen. 8. c. 7)
The See of Rome Act 1536 (28 Hen. 8. c. 10)
The Treason Act 1536 (28 Hen. 8. c. 18)
The Treason Act (Ireland) 1537 (28 Hen. 8. c. 7 (I.))
The Treasons in Wales Act 1540 (32 Hen. 8. c. 4)
The Treason Act 1540 (32 Hen. 8. c. 25)
The Treason Act 1541 (33 Hen. 8. c. 20)
The Royal Assent by Commission Act 1541 (33 Hen. 8. c. 21)

See also Criminal Law Act 1541 (33 Hen. 8. c. 23)

The Crown of Ireland Act 1542 (33 Hen. 8 c. 1 (I.))
The Treason Act 1543 (35 Hen. 8. c. 2)

See also Succession to the Crown Act 1543 and King's Style Act 1543

The Treason Act 1547 (1 Edw. 6. c. 12)
The Riot Act 1549 (3 & 4 Edw. 6. c. 5)
The Treason Act 1551 (5 & 6 Edw. 6. c. 11)
The Treason Act 1553 (1 Mar. Sess. 1. c. 1)
The Treason (No. 2) Act 1553 (1 Mar. Sess. 2. c. 6)
The Treason Act 1554 (1 & 2 Ph. & M. c. 10)

See also Traitorous Words Act 1554 and Counterfeit Coin Act 1554

The Act of Supremacy 1558 (1 Eliz. 1. c. 1)
The Treason Act 1558 (1 Eliz. 1. c. 5)
The Supremacy of the Crown Act 1562 (5 Eliz. 1. c. 1)
The Clipping Coin Act 1562 (5 Eliz. 1. c. 11)
The Treasons Act 1571 (13 Eliz. 1. c. 1)
The Bulls, etc., from Rome Act 1571 (13 Eliz. 1. c. 2)
The Rebellion Act 1572 (14 Eliz. 1 c. 1)
The Escape of Traitors Act 1572 (14 Eliz. 1 c. 2)
The Coin Act 1572 (14 Eliz. 1. c. 3)
The Coin Act 1575 (18 Eliz. 1. c. 1)
The Religion Act 1580 (23 Eliz. 1. c. 1)
The Safety of the Queen, etc. Act 1584 (27 Eliz. 1. c. 1)
The Jesuits, etc. Act 1584 (27 Eliz. 1. c. 2)
The Treason Act 1586 (29 Eliz. 1. c. 2)
The Popish Recusants Act 1605 (3 Jas. 1. c. 4)
The Treasons Act 1649 (Act of the Parliament of the Commonwealth of England)
The Sedition Act 1661 (13 Cha. 2 St. 1. c. 1)
The Correspondence with Enemies Act 1691 (3 Will. & Mar. c. 13)
The Treason Act 1695 (7 & 8 Will. 3. c. 3)
The Security of King and Government Act 1695 (7 & 8 Will. 3. c. 27)
The Coin Act 1696 (8 & 9 Will. 3. c. 26)
The Correspondence with the Pretender Act 1697 (9 Will. 3. c. 1)
The Correspondence with James the Pretender (High Treason) Act 1701 (13 & 14 Will. 3. c. 3)
The Security of the Succession, etc. Act 1701 (13 & 14 Will. 3. c. 6)

See also Coin Act 1696 (1 Ann. c. 9)

The Treason Act 1702 (1 Ann. St. 2. c. 21) (and the Treason Act (Ireland) 1703 (2 Ann. c. 5), which makes equivalent provision)
The Mutiny Act 1703 (2 & 3 Ann. c. 20)
The Correspondence with Enemies Act 1704 (3 & 4 Ann. c. 14)
The Regency Act 1705 (4 & 5 Ann. c. 20)

=== Great Britain ===
20 acts (1707–1799)
The Succession to the Crown Act 1707 (6 Ann. c. 41)
The Treason Act 1708 (7 Ann. c. 21)

See also 7 Ann. c. 25

The Treason Act 1714 (1 Geo. 1. St. 2. c. 33)

See also Treason in Scotland Act 1714 and Crown Lands (Forfeited Estates) Act 1715

The Coin Act 1732 (6 Geo. 2. c. 26)
The Counterfeiting Coin Act 1741 (15 Geo. 2. c. 28)
The Treason Act 1743 (17 Geo. 2. c. 39)
The Habeas Corpus Suspension Act 1745 (19 Geo. 2. c. 1)
The Jurors (Scotland) Act 1745 (19 Geo. 2. c. 9)

see also 19 Geo. 2. c. 26

The Treason Act 1746 (20 Geo. 2. c. 30)

see also Vesting Act 1747 and Traitors Transported Act 1746

The Sheriffs (Scotland) Act 1747 (21 Geo. 2. c. 19)
The Treason Outlawries (Scotland) Act 1748 (22 Geo. 2. c. 48)
The Treason Act 1760 (33 Geo. 2. c. 26) (revived the expired Sheriffs (Scotland) Act 1747)
The Treason Act 1766 (6 Geo. 3. c. 53)
The Treason Act 1777 (17 Geo. 3. c. 9)
The Treason Act 1790 (30 Geo. 3. c. 48)
The Correspondence with Enemies Act 1793 (33 Geo. 3. c. 27)
The Treason Act 1795 (36 Geo. 3. c. 7)
The Counterfeiting Coin Act 1797 (37 Geo. 3. c. 126)
The Correspondence with Enemies Act 1798 (38 Geo. 3. c. 28)
The Forfeiture upon Attainder of Treason Act 1799 (39 Geo. 3. c. 93)

=== United Kingdom ===
16 acts (1800–2013)
The Treason Act 1800 (39 & 40 Geo. 3. c. 93)
The Treason Act 1814 (54 Geo. 3. c. 146)
The Treason Act 1817 (57 Geo. 3. c. 6)
The Treason (Ireland) Act 1821 (1 & 2 Geo. 4 c. 24)
The Forgery Act 1830 (11 Geo. 4. & 1 Will. 4. c. 66)
The Regency Act 1830 (1 Will. 4. c. 2)
The Coinage Offences Act 1832 (2 & 3 Will. 4. c. 34)
The Regency Act 1840 (3 & 4 Vict. c. 52)
The Treason Act 1842 (5 & 6 Vict. c. 51)
The Treason Felony Act 1848 (11 & 12 Vict. c. 12)
The Treason (Ireland) Act 1854 (17 & 18 Vict. c. 26)
The Forgery Act 1861 (24 & 25 Vict. c. 98)
The Treachery Act 1940 (3 & 4 Geo. 6. c. 40)
The Treason Act 1945 (8 & 9 Geo. 6. c. 44)
The Succession to the Crown Act 2013 (c. 20) (amends the Treason Act 1351)

=== Ireland ===
==== Kingdom of Ireland ====
The Treason Act (Ireland) 1537 (28 Hen. 8 c. 7)
The Crown of Ireland Act 1542 (33 Hen. 8 c. 1 (I. Sect. II)
The Act of Supremacy (Ireland) 1560 (2 Eliz. 1 c. 1)
The Treason Act (Ireland) 1703 (2 Ann. c. 5 (I.))
The Treason Act (Ireland) 1765 (5 Geo. 3 c. 21 (I.))
The Treason by Women Act (Ireland) 1796 (36 Geo. 3 c. 31)

==== United Kingdom ====
The Treason (Ireland) Act 1821 (1 & 2 Geo. 4 c. 24)
The Treason (Ireland) Act 1854 (17 & 18 Vict. c. 26)

=== Republic of Ireland ===
The Treasonable Offences Act 1925 (repealed in 1939)
The Treason Act 1939

== See also ==
- List of short titles
- High treason in the United Kingdom
- Habeas Corpus Suspension Act
