= Treason (Ireland) Act 1821 =

Act of the Parliament of the United Kingdom

Treason (Ireland) Act 1821 (Note: The citation of this act by this short title was authorised by section 1 of, and the first schedule to, the Short Titles Act 1896. Due to the repeal of those provisions it is now authorised by section 19(2) of the Interpretation Act 1978.)
- Act of Parliament
- Parliament of the United Kingdom
- Long title: An Act to extend certain Provisions of an Act of King William the Third, intituled "An Act for regulating of Trials in Cases of Treason and Misprision of Treason," to [that part of the United Kingdom called] Ireland. (Note: The words "that part of the United Kingdom called" were repealed by section 4(b) of the Statute Law Revision Act 1948.)
- Citation: 1 & 2 Geo. 4. c. 24
- Territorial extent: United Kingdom

Dates
- Royal assent: 19 April 1821
- Commencement: 1 January 1822 (Note: Section 1.)
- Repealed: Republic of Ireland: 16 May 1983
Other legislation
Amends	Treason Act 1695
Amended by	Statute Law Revision Act 1888; Statute Law Revision (No. 2) Act 1890; Treason Act 1945
Repealed by	Republic of Ireland: Statute Law Revision Act 1983
Relates to	Treason Act 1695; Treason Act 1708; Treason Act (Ireland) 1765

Status: Amended

Status
- Republic of Ireland: Repealed
- Northern Ireland: Amended

Text of statute as originally enacted

Revised text of statute as amended

Text of the Treason (Ireland) Act 1821 as in force today (including any amendments) within the United Kingdom, from legislation.gov.uk.

The Treason (Ireland) Act 1821 (1 & 2 Geo. 4. c. 24) is an act of the Parliament of the United Kingdom. It extended most of the English Treason Act 1695 (7 & 8 Will. 3. c. 3) to Ireland. The 1695 act as enacted applied to England and Wales and was extended to Scotland by the Treason Act 1708 (7 Ann. c. 21).

== Provisions ==
=== Section 1 ===
As originally enacted, section 1 of the act extended sections 2 to 5 of the Treason Act 1695 (7 & 8 Will. 3. c. 3) to Ireland. (Note: The marginal notes to the recital in "The Statutes of the United Kingdom of Great Britain and Ireland" by John Raithby) All but section 5 of the 1695 act were repealed by the Treason Act 1945 (8 & 9 Geo. 6. c. 44). Therefore, today the effect of section 1 is only to extend section 5 of the act to Northern Ireland, which imposes a three-year time limit on bringing prosecutions for treason.

=== Section 2 ===
Section 2 of the act stated that the above time limit did not apply to attempts on the life of the king, or to misprision of such treason. (Similar provision had been made in section 6 of the act.) Section 2 also stated that trials for such treason or misprision were to be conducted according to the rules of evidence and procedure applicable in ordinary murder trials, which were different from the rules for treason trials. The rule had been introduced in Great Britain by the Treason Act 1800.)

== Subsequent developments ==
The words of enactment in section 2 of the act were repealed by section 1(1) of, and part I of the schedule to, the Statute Law Revision Act 1888 (51 & 52 Vict. c. 3), which came into force on 27 March 1888.

Section 1 of the act to "twenty-two" was repealed by section 1 of, and the first schedule to, the Statute Law Revision Act 1890 (53 & 54 Vict. c. 33), which came into force on 4 August 1890.

Section 2 of the act was repealed by section 2(1) of, and the schedule to, the Treason Act 1945 (8 & 9 Geo. 6. c. 44), which came into force on 15 June 1945.

The whole act was repealed for the Republic of Ireland by section 1 of, and part 4 of the schedule to, the Statute Law Revision Act 1983, which came into force on 16 May 1983.

== See also ==
- Treason Act (Ireland) 1765
- Treason (Ireland) Act 1854
- Treason Act
