= Treason (Ireland) Act 1854 =

Act of the Parliament of the United Kingdom

Treason (Ireland) Act 1854 (Note: The citation of this act by this short title was authorised by section 1 of, and the first schedule to, the Short Titles Act 1896. Due to the repeal of those provisions it is now authorised by section 19(2) of the Interpretation Act 1978.)
- Act of Parliament
- Parliament of the United Kingdom
- Long title: An Act to assimilate the Law and Practice existing in cases of High Treason in Ireland to the Law and Practice existing in Cases of High Treason in England.
- Citation: 17 & 18 Vict. c. 26
- Territorial extent: United Kingdom

Dates
- Royal assent: 3 July 1854
- Commencement: 1 August 1854 (Note: Section 1.)
- Repealed: 15 June 1945
Other legislation
Repealed by	Treason Act 1945
Relates to	Treason Act 1708

Status: Repealed

Status
- Republic of Ireland: Amended
- Northern Ireland: Repealed

Text of statute as originally enacted

The Treason (Ireland) Act 1854 (17 & 18 Vict. c. 26) was an act of the Parliament of the United Kingdom. It extended part of the Treason Act 1708 (7 Ann. c. 21) to Ireland, specifically the rules about giving the defendant advance notice of the witnesses and jurors in his case. It was repealed as regards Northern Ireland by the Treason Act 1945 (8 & 9 Geo. 6. c. 44), which abolished the unique procedural rules which applied in treason cases. As of 16 January 2020 it remains in force in the Republic of Ireland.

The rule in the 1708 act which was extended to Ireland was as follows:

[W]hen any person is indicted for high treason or misprision of treason, a list of the witnesses that shall be produced on the trial, for proving the said indictment, and of the jury, mentioning the name, professions, and place of abode of the said witnesses and jurors, be also given at the same time that the copy of the indictment is delivered to the party indicted; and that copies of all indictments for the offences aforesaid, with such lists, shall be delivered to the party indicted, ten days before the trial, and in presence of two or more credible witnesses; any law or statute to the contrary notwithstanding.

== Subsequent developments ==
The whole act was repealed for the United Kingdom by section 2(1) of, and the schedule to, the Treason Act 1945 (8 & 9 Geo. 6. c. 44), which came into force on 15 June 1945.

== See also ==
- Poynings' Law (confirmation of English statutes)
- Treason Act (Ireland) 1765
- Treason (Ireland) Act 1821
- Treason Act 1939
- Treason Act
