= Treason Act 1766 =

Act of the Parliament of Great Britain

Treason Act 1766 (Note: The citation of this act by this short title was authorised by section 1 of, and the first schedule to, the Short Titles Act 1896. Due to the repeal of those provisions it is now authorised by section 19(2) of the Interpretation Act 1978.)
- Act of Parliament
- Parliament of Great Britain
- Long title: An Act for altering the Oath of Abjuration and the Assurance; and for amending so much of an Act of the Seventh Year of her late Majesty Queen Anne, intituled, An Act for the Improvement of the Union of the two Kingdoms, as, after the Time therein limited, requires the Delivery of certain Lists and Copies therein mentioned to Persons indicted of High Treason, or Misprision of Treason.
- Citation: 6 Geo. 3. c. 53
- Territorial extent: Great Britain

Dates
- Royal assent: 6 June 1766
- Commencement: 4 June 1766 (Note: Section 1.)
- Repealed: 15 June 1945

Other legislation
- Amends: Treason Act 1708; Security of the Sovereign Act 1714; Church Patronage (Scotland) Act 1718
- Amended by: Promissory Oaths Act 1871
- Repealed by: Treason Act 1945
- Relates to: Lords Justices Act 1837; Regency Act 1840

Status: Repealed

Text of statute as originally enacted

The Treason Act 1766 (6 Geo. 3. c. 53) was an act of the Parliament of Great Britain. The long title was "An Act for altering the Oath of Abjuration and the Assurance; and for amending so much of an Act of the Seventh Year of her late Majesty Queen Anne, intituled, An Act for the Improvement of the Union of the two Kingdoms, as, after the Time therein limited, requires the Delivery of certain Lists and Copies therein mentioned to Persons indicted of High Treason, or Misprision of Treason."

Sections 1 and 2 of the act were concerned with the oath of abjuration. Section 3 of the act disapplied certain procedural requirements in cases of high treason consisting of counterfeiting the king's coin; namely the requirement in section 11 of the Treason Act 1708 (7 Ann. c. 21) that the accused be given a list of the witnesses and the jurors. (This requirement had only come into force in 1766, on the death of James Francis Edward Stuart, the Jacobite pretender to the throne.)

== Subsequent developments ==
The whole act, exception section 3, was repealed by section 1 of, and part II of schedule one to, the Promissory Oaths Act 1871 (34 & 35 Vict. c. 48), which came into force on 13 July 1871.

The whole act was repealed by section 2(1) of, and the schedule to, the Treason Act 1945 (8 & 9 Geo. 6. c. 44), which came into force on 15 June 1945.

== See also ==
- High treason in the United Kingdom
- Treason Act
