= Treason Act 1695 =

Act of the Parliament of England

Treason Act 1695 (Note: The citation of this act by this short title was authorised by section 1 of, and the first schedule to, the Short Titles Act 1896. Due to the repeal of those provisions it is now authorised by section 19(2) of the Interpretation Act 1978.)
- Act of Parliament
- Parliament of England
- Long title: An Act for regulateing of Tryals in Cases of Treason and Misprision of Treason.
- Citation: 7 & 8 Will. 3. c. 3
- Territorial extent: England and Wales; Scotland; Ireland

Dates
- Royal assent: 21 January 1696
- Commencement: 25 March 1696 (Note: Section 1.)
Other legislation
Amended by	Treason Act 1708; Treason (Ireland) Act 1821; Statute Law Revision Act 1867; Promissory Oaths Act 1871; Statute Law Revision Act 1888; Short Titles Act 1896; Criminal Appeal Act 1907; Administration of Justice (Miscellaneous Provisions) Act 1933; Administration of Justice (Miscellaneous Provisions) Act 1938; Treason Act 1945; Statute Law Revision Act 1948; Coroners and Justice Act 2009
Relates to	Sedition Act 1661; Security of King and Government Act 1695; Treason Act (Ireland) 1765; Correspondence with Enemies Act 1793

Status: Amended

Text of statute as originally enacted

Revised text of statute as amended

Text of the Treason Act 1695 as in force today (including any amendments) within the United Kingdom, from legislation.gov.uk.

The Treason Act 1695 (7 & 8 Will. 3. c. 3) is an act of the Parliament of England which laid down rules of evidence and procedure in high treason trials. It was passed by the English Parliament but was extended to cover Scotland in 1708 by the Treason Act 1708 (7 Ann. c. 21) and Ireland by the Treason (Ireland) Act 1821 (1 & 2 Geo. 4. c. 24).

Between 1817 and 1998 the protection of the act was removed from those accused of treason by assaulting the heir to the throne, or misprision of such treason.

The act was notable for the provision that two witnesses were needed to prove a charge of treason, a rule which still exists today in the United States Constitution.

As of 2025, sections 5 and 6 of the act are still in force for England and Wales.

== Background ==
The act was passed because previously the law had been extremely harsh, allowing little opportunity for a defendant to defend himself and enabling trumped-up charges of treason to succeed. By the 1680s even the notoriously severe Judge Jeffreys was prepared to admit that it was "hard" that the accused in a treason trial had no right to counsel.

== Provisions ==
The act provided that:

- People accused of treason should have the right to be represented by up to two counsel.
- Nobody could be convicted of treason except by the evidence of two witnesses to the same offence (but not necessarily the same overt act of the offence). (This rule, previously enacted in the Treason Act 1547 (1 Edw. 6. c. 12), the Treason Act 1554 (1 & 2 Ph. & M. c. 10) and the Sedition Act 1661 (13 Cha. 2 St. 1. c. 1), was inherited by the United States and incorporated into Article III, Section 3 of the United States Constitution, which added that both witnesses had to have witnessed the same overt act.)
- Nobody could be prosecuted or punished for treason or misprision of treason unless the indictment was signed by the grand jury within three years of the crime being committed (except in cases of an attempt on the life of the King, or treason outside England and Wales).
- A defendant should be allowed to have a copy of the indictment against him (at his own expense).
- No evidence could be used against him except what was pleaded in the indictment.

However, the act did not apply to forgery (some kinds of forgery were classed as high treason by the Treason Act 1351 (25 Edw. 3 Stat. 5. c. 2)), or to petty treason.

== Subsequent developments ==
Today most of the act has been repealed, but the three-year time limit still survives (see below), and of course, the rights to be represented and to have a copy of the indictment (now free of charge) still exist in other legislation. However, the "two witnesses" rule no longer exists in the United Kingdom. In 1800 this rule, and all other special rules of evidence in treason cases, were abolished for cases of killing or attempting to kill the Sovereign by the Treason Act 1800 (39 & 40 Geo. 3 c. 93).

The Treason Act 1842 (5 & 6 Vict. c. 51) extended this exception still further, to all attempts to maim or wound the Sovereign (non-lethal assaults on the Sovereign were treason until 1998).

The whole act, except sections 5 and 6, was repealed by section 2(1) of, and the schedule to, the Treason Act 1945 (8 & 9 Geo. 6 c. 44). The 1945 act removed the special status of treason for all kinds of treason, and ever since then the evidence required, and the procedure followed, in treason proceedings have been the same as in murder trials.

== The act today ==
The three-year time limit described above – and the original exception to it – are still on the law books today, and are contained in sections 5 and 6 of the act. (However grand juries were abolished in England in 1933, and now indictments need no longer be signed.) When in 2000 a British newspaper suggested that James Hewitt be prosecuted under the Treason Act 1351 (25 Edw. 3 Stat. 5. c. 2) for an alleged affair with Diana, Princess of Wales, it was pointed out that the mooted evidence fell outside the time limit.

== See also ==
- High treason in the United Kingdom
- Article Three of the US Constitution, section 3
- Security of King and Government Act 1695
- Treason Act
- Treason Act (Ireland) 1765
