= Treason Outlawries (Scotland) Act 1748 =

Act of the Parliament of Great Britain

Treason Outlawries (Scotland) Act 1748 (Note: The citation of this act by this short title was authorised by section 1 of, and the first schedule to, the Short Titles Act 1896. Due to the repeal of those provisions it is now authorised by section 19(2) of the Interpretation Act 1978.)
- Act of Parliament
- Parliament of Great Britain
- Long title: An Act to ascertain and establish the Method of proceeding to and upon Outlawries for High Treason and Misprision of High Treason, in Scotland.
- Citation: 22 Geo. 2. c. 48
- Territorial extent: Great Britain

Dates
- Royal assent: 13 June 1749
- Commencement: 29 November 1748 (Note: Start of session.)
- Repealed: 16 June 1977

Other legislation
- Amended by: Statute Law Revision Act 1888
- Repealed by: Statute Law (Repeals) Act 1977
- Relates to: Treason Act 1708; Sheriffs (Scotland) Act 1747

Status: Repealed

Text of statute as originally enacted

The Treason Outlawries (Scotland) Act 1748 (Note: The act was actually passed in 1749, but is listed under 1748 because under the common law acts of Parliament took effect retrospectively from the beginning of the session in which they were passed, which in this case was 1748: see the article Acts of Parliament (Commencement) Act 1793 for the explanation as to why.) (22 Geo. 2. c. 48) was an act of the Parliament of Great Britain which applied only to Scotland. Its long title was "An Act to ascertain and establish the Method of Proceeding to and upon Outlawries for High Treason and Misprision of High Treason, in Scotland."

The act set out the procedure to be followed when anyone was prosecuted for treason or misprision of treason in Scotland. In particular, anyone who failed to surrender to the justice of the Scottish courts was to be automatically outlawed and attainted for the crime they were charged with, without the need for a trial, unless they had been out of Great Britain at the time, in which case they were still entitled to a trial provided that they returned and submitted themselves to the court within one year.

== Subsequent developments ==
The whole act was repealed by section 1(1) of, and part IV of schedule 1 to, the Statute Law (Repeals) Act 1977, which came into force on 16 June 1977.

== See also ==
- Treason Act
- Treason Act 1708
- Sheriffs (Scotland) Act 1747
