= Treason Act (Ireland) 1765 =

Act of the Parliament of Ireland

- Act of Parliament
- Parliament of Ireland
- Long title: An Act for the better regulating of trials in cases of high treason under the statute of the twenty fifth of Edward the third.
- Citation: 5 Geo. 3. c. 21 (I)
- Territorial extent: Ireland

Dates
- Royal assent: 7 June 1766
- Commencement: 1 August 1766 (Note: Section 1.)
- Repealed: 15 June 1945: Northern Ireland

Other legislation
- Amended by: Statute Law Revision (Ireland) Act 1879
- Repealed by: Treason Act 1945: Northern Ireland
- Relates to: Treason Act 1351; Treason Act 1695

Status: Repealed

Text of statute as originally enacted

The Treason Act (Ireland) 1765 (5 Geo. 3. c. 21 (I)) was an act of the former Parliament of Ireland which gave defendants in trials for high treason under the Treason Act 1351 (25 Edw. 3 Stat. 5. c. 2) the right to be represented by counsel and the right to be given a copy of the indictment in advance of their trial.

These rights had been available under English law since the Treason Act 1695 (7 & 8 Will. 3. c. 3), and under Scottish law since that act was extended to Scotland by the Treason Act 1708 (7 Ann. c. 21).

The act's long title was An Act for the better regulating of trials in cases of high treason under the statute of the twenty fifth of Edward the third (sic). It was repealed for Northern Ireland by the Treason Act 1945 (8 & 9 Geo. 6. c. 44), by which time it had long been obsolete.

== See also ==
- Treason Act
- Treason (Ireland) Act 1821
