= Correspondence with Enemies Act 1793 =

Act of the Parliament of Great Britain

- Act of Parliament
- Parliament of Great Britain
- Long title: An act more effectually to prevent, during the present war between Great Britain and France, all traitorous correspondence with or aid or assistance being given to, his Majesty's enemies.
- Citation: 33 Geo. 3. c. 27
- Territorial extent: Great Britain; various; § Commencement and extent

Dates
- Royal assent: 7 May 1793
- Commencement: various (Note: See § Commencement and extent)
- Repealed: 21 August 1871
Other legislation
Amended by	Correspondence with Enemies Act 1798
Repealed by	Statute Law Revision Act 1871
Relates to	Treason Act 1695

Status: Repealed

Text of statute as originally enacted

The Correspondence with Enemies Act 1793 (33 Geo. 3. c. 27) was an act of the Parliament of Great Britain passed at the beginning of the French Revolutionary Wars. France had declared war on Great Britain on 1 February; the act was passed on 7 May 1793 to prohibit trade between the countries.

== Provisions of the act ==
Section 1 of the act made it high treason for any person resident in Great Britain to "knowingly and wilfully" supply materials to France during the war, without a licence from the king.

Section 2 of the act made the buying land in France, or lending somebody money with which to buy land in France, also treason.

Section 3 of the act provided that merely travelling to France was punishable with imprisonment for up to 6 months.

Section of the act made void any insurance policy relating to any ship or wares belonging to French subjects was made void.

The rules of procedure and evidence contained in the Treason Act 1695 (7 & 8 Will. 3. c. 3) and the Treason Act 1708 (7 Ann. c. 21) were to apply to treason under the act. The Act did not apply to anyone in the army or navy (but such people were subject to military or naval law instead).

== Commencement and extent ==
The act contained an unusual feature, in that instead of coming into force on one particular date, it instead came into force on different dates in different parts of the world. It came into force in May 1793 in respect of acts done in Great Britain, and also in May in respect of anything done outside of Great Britain by anyone who had been in Great Britain at any time after 1 April. It came into force on 1 June in respect of anything done in Europe (other than Great Britain) by anyone who had not been in Great Britain at any time between 1 April and 1 June. It came into force on 1 August as to any acts done outside Europe, but not beyond the Cape of Good Hope, by anyone who had not been in Great Britain between 1 April and 1 August. It came into force on 1 November in respect of anything done beyond the Cape of Good Hope by anyone who had not been in Great Britain between 1 April and 1 November 1793.

== The Netherlands ==
In 1798 the provisions of the act were extended to cover the Batavian Republic (the French-occupied Netherlands) by the Correspondence with Enemies Act 1798 (38 Geo. 3. c. 28), which had commencement provisions similar to the 1793 act.

== Subsequent developments ==
The whole act was repealed by section 1 of, and the schedule to, the Statute Law Revision Act 1871 (34 & 35 Vict. c. 116), which came into force on 21 August 1871.

== See also ==
- Treason Act
- High treason in the United Kingdom
- Acts of Parliament (Commencement) Act 1793

== Bibliography ==
- Statutes at Large, vol. XII, London: Eyre, Straham, Woodfall (1794).
