= Compounding treason =

Offence under the common law of England

Compounding treason is an offence under the common law of England. It is committed by anyone who agrees for consideration to abstain from prosecuting the offender who has committed treason.

It is still an offence in England and Wales, and in Northern Ireland. It has been abolished in the Republic of Ireland.

In 1977, the Law Commission recommended that the offence should be abolished for England and Wales and for Northern Ireland.

== See also ==
- Compounding a felony
- High treason in the United Kingdom
- Misprision of treason
