= Treason Act 1945 =

Act of the Parliament of the United Kingdom

Treason Act 1945 (Note: Section 3(1).)
- Act of Parliament
- Parliament of the United Kingdom
- Long title: An Act to assimilate the procedure in all cases of treason and misprision of treason to the procedure in cases of murder.
- Citation: 8 & 9 Geo. 6. c. 44
- Territorial extent: United Kingdom (Note: The act is presumed to extend to the United Kingdom because the contrary is not specified)

Dates
- Royal assent: 15 June 1945
- Commencement: 15 June 1945 (Note: The Acts of Parliament (Commencement) Act 1793.)
- Repealed: Northern Ireland: 1 September 1973; Scotland: 1 February 1981
Other legislation
Amends	Treason Act 1695; Treason Act 1708; Treason Act 1800; Treason Act 1842
Repeals/revokes	Jurors (Scotland) Act 1745; Treason Act 1766; Treason (Ireland) Act 1854
Amended by	Statute Law Revision Act 1953; Criminal Law Act 1967; Northern Ireland Constitution Act 1973
Repealed by	Northern Ireland: Criminal Law Act (Northern Ireland) 1967 and Northern Ireland Constitution Act 1973; Scotland: Criminal Justice (Scotland) Act 1980

Status: Partially repealed

Text of statute as originally enacted

The Treason Act 1945 (8 & 9 Geo. 6. c. 44) is an act of the Parliament of the United Kingdom.

It was introduced into the House of Lords as a purely procedural statute, whose sole purpose was to abolish the old and highly technical procedure in cases of treason, and assimilate it to the procedure on trials for murder:

Its provisions are absolutely confined to matters of procedure, and it does not make any change whatsoever in the law as to what constitutes treason.

It also abolished the rule that treason trials in Scotland had to be conducted according to the rules of English criminal law.

== Provisions ==
=== Section 1 ===
Section 1 of the act applied the Treason Act 1800 (39 & 40 Geo. 3 c. 93) to all cases of treason and misprision of treason, subject to five separate repeals of words, and to a saving clause in section 2(2):

The Treason Act, 1800 (which assimilates the procedure in certain cases of treason and misprision of treason to the procedure in cases of murder) shall apply in all cases of treason and misprision of treason whether alleged to have been committed before or after the passing of this Act.

=== Section 2 ===
Section 2(1) of the act effected consequential repeals.

The application of the Treason Act 1800 was subject to a saving clause in section 2(2).

For the removal of doubt it is hereby declared that nothing in the Treason Act, 1800, shall be deemed to have repealed any of the provisions of the Treason Act, 1695, or of the Treason Act, 1708, except the provisions of those Acts specified in the third column of the Schedule to this Act.

=== Section 3 ===
Section 3(1) of the act provided that it may be cited as the "Treason Act, 1945".

Section 3(2) of the act extended the Treason Act 1800 (39 & 40 Geo. 3 c. 93), as applied by the act, to Northern Ireland.

Section 3(3) of the act provided that, for the purposes of section 6 of the Government of Ireland Act 1920 (10 & 11 Geo. 5. c. 67), the act was to be deemed to be an act passed before the appointed day.

== Use ==
The procedure established by this act was used in four trials: those of William Joyce, John Amery, Thomas Haller Cooper and Walter Purdy. J. W. Hall said that if the statutory requirement for corroboration had not been repealed by this act, William Joyce could not have been convicted on the basis of the evidence offered at his trial. One witness, Detective Inspector Hunt, connected him with the broadcasts during the period before the expiration of the passport (though other witnesses might have come forward).

== Subsequent developments ==
The schedule to the act, except in so far as it relates to the Treason Act 1695 (7 & 8 Will. 3. c. 3), and the Treason Act 1708 (7 Ann. c. 21), was repealed by section 1 of, and the first schedule to, the Statute Law Revision Act 1953 (2 & 3 Eliz. 2. c. 5), which came into force on 18 December 1953.

The whole act, so far as unrepealed, was repealed for England and Wales by section 10(2) of, and part III of schedule 3 to, the Criminal Law Act 1967, which came into force on 1 January 1968. Section 12(6) of the 1967 replaced the 1945 act.

Sections 1 and 2, and the schedule to, the act were repealed for England and Wales by section 10(2) of, and part III of schedule 3 to, the Criminal Law Act 1967, which came into force on 1 January 1968.

The whole act, so far as unrepealed, was repealed for Northern Ireland by section 15(2) of, and schedule 2 to, the Criminal Law Act (Northern Ireland) 1967, which came into force on 1 January 1968.

Section 3(3) of the act was repealed by section 41(1) of, and part I of schedule 6 to, the Northern Ireland Constitution Act 1973, which came into force on 18 July 1973.

The whole act was repealed for Scotland by section 83(3) of, and schedule 8 to, the Criminal Justice (Scotland) Act 1980, which came into force on 1 February 1981.

== See also ==
- High treason in the United Kingdom
- Treason Act
