= List of acts of the Parliament of Great Britain from 1748 =

This is a complete list of acts of the Parliament of Great Britain for the year 1748.

For acts passed until 1707, see the list of acts of the Parliament of England and the list of acts of the Parliament of Scotland. See also the list of acts of the Parliament of Ireland.

For acts passed from 1801 onwards, see the list of acts of the Parliament of the United Kingdom. For acts of the devolved parliaments and assemblies in the United Kingdom, see the list of acts of the Scottish Parliament, the list of acts of the Northern Ireland Assembly, and the list of acts and measures of Senedd Cymru; see also the list of acts of the Parliament of Northern Ireland.

The number shown after each act's title is its chapter number. Acts are cited using this number, preceded by the year(s) of the reign during which the relevant parliamentary session was held; thus the Union with Ireland Act 1800 is cited as "39 & 40 Geo. 3. c. 67", meaning the 67th act passed during the session that started in the 39th year of the reign of George III and which finished in the 40th year of that reign. Note that the modern convention is to use Arabic numerals in citations (thus "41 Geo. 3" rather than "41 Geo. III").

Acts of the last session of the Parliament of Great Britain and the first session of the Parliament of the United Kingdom are both cited as "41 Geo. 3". Acts passed by the Parliament of Great Britain did not have a short title; however, some of these acts have subsequently been given a short title by acts of the Parliament of the United Kingdom (such as the Short Titles Act 1896).

Before the Acts of Parliament (Commencement) Act 1793 came into force on 8 April 1793, acts passed by the Parliament of Great Britain were deemed to have come into effect on the first day of the session in which they were passed. Because of this, the years given in the list below may in fact be the year before a particular act was passed.

== 22 Geo. 2 ==
The second session of the 10th Parliament of Great Britain, which met from 29 November 1748 until 13 June 1749.

This session was also traditionally cited as 22 G. 2.

=== Public acts ===
| Short title | Citation | Royal assent |
Long title
| Taxation Act 1748 (repealed) | 22 Geo. 2. c. 1 | 22 December 1748 |
An Act for continuing and granting to His Majesty certain Duties upon Malt, Mum, Cyder, and Perry, for the Service of the Year One Thousand Seven Hundred and Forty-nine. (Repealed by Statute Law Revision Act 1867 (30 & 31 Vict. c. 59))
| Land Tax Act 1748 (repealed) | 22 Geo. 2. c. 2 | 16 February 1749 |
An Act for granting an Aid to His Majesty, by a Land Tax, to be raised in Great Britain, for the Service of the Year One Thousand Seven Hundred and Forty-nine. (Repealed by Statute Law Revision Act 1867 (30 & 31 Vict. c. 59))
| Prize Causes Act 1748 (repealed) | 22 Geo. 2. c. 3 | 16 February 1749 |
An Act declaring the Authority of the Commissioners appointed by His Majesty under the Great Seal of Great Britain, for receiving, hearing, and determining, Appeals in Causes of Prizes. (Repealed by Naval Prize Acts Repeal Act 1864 (27 & 28 Vict. c. 23))
| Farnborough and Sevenoaks Road Act 1748 (repealed) | 22 Geo. 2. c. 4 | 16 February 1749 |
An Act for repairing and widening the Road leading from the Well at the North West End of the Town or Village of Farnborough, (Note: Farnborough, Kent.) in the County of Kent, to a Place called Riverhill, in the Parish of Sevenoaks, (Note: Sevenoaks, Kent.) in the said County. (Repealed by Farnborough and Sevenoaks Road Act 1816 (56 Geo. 3. c. xxxiv))
| Mutiny Act 1748 (repealed) | 22 Geo. 2. c. 5 | 22 March 1749 |
An Act for punishing Mutiny and Desertion, and for the better Payment of the Army and their Quarters. (Repealed by Statute Law Revision Act 1867 (30 & 31 Vict. c. 59))
| Maryport Harbour Act 1748 (repealed) | 22 Geo. 2. c. 6 | 22 March 1749 |
An Act for repairing, enlarging, and preserving, the Harbour of Ellenfoot, in the County of Cumberland. (Repealed by Maryport Harbour and Improvement Act 1833 (3 & 4 Will. 4. c. cxiii))
| Northumberland Roads Act 1748 (repealed) | 22 Geo. 2. c. 7 | 22 March 1749 |
An Act for repairing the Road from The West Cowgate, near the Town of Newcastle upon Tyne, through the West End of Kenton, Pont Eland, Higham Dykes, Newham Edge, Belsay Mill, and South Middleton, to the North Side of the River Wanspeck, in the County of Northumberland. (Repealed by West Cowgate and Alemouth Road Act 1797 (37 Geo. 3. c. 163))
| Kent Roads (No. 2) Act 1748 (repealed) | 22 Geo. 2. c. 8 | 22 March 1749 |
An Act to continue Two Acts of Parliament, One of the First, (Note: Rochester to Maidstone Road Act 1727 (1 Geo. 2. St. 2. c. 12)) and the other of the Ninth, (Note: Kent Roads Act 1735 (9 Geo. 2. c. 7)) Year of the Reign of His present Majesty, for repairing and enlarging the Road leading from the House called The Sign of the Bills in the Parish of St Margaret in Rochester, to Maidstone, and other Road therein mentioned, in the County of Kent, and to rendering the same more effectual. (Repealed by Kent Roads (No. 2) Act 1773 (13 Geo. 3. c. 114), Rochester and Maidstone Road Act 1821 (1 & 2 Geo. 4. c. xl) and Annual Turnpike Acts Continuance Act 1867 (30 & 31 Vict. c. 121))
| North Shields to Newcastle Road Act 1748 (repealed) | 22 Geo. 2. c. 9 | 22 March 1749 |
An Act for repairing the Road from North Shields, in the County of Northumberland, to the Town of Newcastle upon Tyne. (Repealed by Road from North Shields to Newcastle-upon-Tyne Act 1831 (1 & 2 Will. 4. c. lxxii))
| Anstruther Easter Beer Duties Act 1748 (repealed) | 22 Geo. 2. c. 10 | 22 March 1749 |
An Act for laying a Duty of Two Pennies Scots upon every Scots Pint of Beer and Ale, which shall be sold or vended, brewed, brought in, or tapped for Sale, within the Town of Anstrather Easter and Liberties thereof. (Repealed by Statute Law Revision Act 1948 (11 & 12 Geo. 6. c. 62))
| Isle of Ely Drainage Act 1748 | 22 Geo. 2. c. 11 | 22 March 1749 |
An Act for draining and preserving certain Fen Lands and Low Grounds, in the several Parishes of Sutton, Mepall, Witcham, Chatteris, Doddington, and a Place called Byal Fen, in the Isle of Ely, and County of Cambridge, and also in the Parishes of Somersham and Pidley with Fenton, in the County of Huntingdon.
| Buxton to Manchester Road Act 1748 (repealed) | 22 Geo. 2. c. 12 | 22 March 1749 |
An Act for continuing and making more effectual Two Acts of Parliament, the one passed in the Eleventh Year of the Reign of His late Majesty King George the First, (Note: Derbyshire Roads Act 1724 (11 Geo. 1. c. 13)) and the other in the Third Year of the Reign of His present Majesty, (Note: Buxton to Manchester Road Act 1729 (3 Geo. 2. c. 4)) for repairing the Road leading from Sherbrooke Hill, near Buxton and Chapel in the Frith, in the County of Derby, through the Town of Stockport, in the County of Chester, to Manchester, in the County of Lancaster, and for amending other Roads adjoining to the Road directed to be repaired by the first-mentioned Act. (Repealed by Manchester to Buxton Road Act 1793 (33 Geo. 3. c. 171))
| Kinghorn Beer Duties Act 1748 (repealed) | 22 Geo. 2. c. 13 | 22 March 1749 |
An Act for laying a Duty of Two Pennies Scots, or One Sixth Part of a Penny Sterling, upon every Scots Pint of Ale and Beer, which shall be brewed for Sale, brought into, tapped, or sold, within the Town of Kinghorn and Liberties thereof. (Repealed by Statute Law Revision Act 1948 (11 & 12 Geo. 6. c. 62))
| Kilburn Road Act 1748 (repealed) | 22 Geo. 2. c. 14 | 22 March 1749 |
An Act for continuing and making more effectual Two Acts of Parliament, (Note: Kilburn Road Act 1711 (10 Ann. c. 3)) (Note: Kilburn Road Act 1721 (8 Geo. 1. c. 9)) for repairing the Highway between a certain Place called Kilburn Bridge, (Note: Kilburn Bridge was located where the Edgware Road (Kilburn High Road) crossed the River Westbourne. The river is now culverted. 51°32′08″N 0°11′25″W) in the County of Middlesex, and Sparrows Herne, (Note: Sparrows Herne was a settlement located between Bushey and Bushey Heath. The section of the A411 road in the area continues the name. 51°38′17″N 0°21′04″W) in the County of Hertford. (Repealed by Kilburn Road Act 1779 (19 Geo. 3. c. 120) and Metropolis Roads Act 1826 (7 Geo. 4. c. cxlii))
| Leominster Roads Act 1748 (repealed) | 22 Geo. 2. c. 15 | 22 March 1749 |
An Act for enlarging the Term and Powers granted by an Act passed in the Second Year of the Reign of His present Majesty, (Note: Leominster Roads Act 1728 (2 Geo. 2. c. 13)) for repairing the several Roads therein mentioned, leading into the Town of Leominster, in the County of Hereford, and for making the said Act more effectual. (Repealed by Leominster Roads Act 1800 (39 & 40 Geo. 3. c. lxv))
| Denver, etc. (Norfolk and Cambridge) Drainage Act 1748 (repealed) | 22 Geo. 2. c. 16 | 22 March 1749 |
An Act for draining and improving certain Fen Lands, within the Manors and Parishes of Upwell and Outwell, and the Parishes of Denver and Welney, in the Isle of Ely, and Counties of Cambridge and Norfolk. (Repealed by Upwell, Outwell, Denver and Wellney Drainage Act 1801 (41 Geo. 3. (U.K.) c. xxxiv))
| Northamptonshire Roads Act 1748 (repealed) | 22 Geo. 2. c. 17 | 22 March 1749 |
An Act for effectually amending and repairing the Road leading from Wansford Bridge, in the County of Northampton, to the Town of Stamford, in the County of Lincoln. (Repealed by Wansford Bridge and Bourn Road Act 1820 (1 Geo. 4. c. xxii))
| Hereford Roads Act 1748 (repealed) | 22 Geo. 2. c. 18 | 26 May 1749 |
An Act for enlarging the Term and Powers granted by an Act passed in the Third Year of the Reign of His present Majesty, (Note: Hereford Roads Act 1729 (3 Geo. 2. c. 18)) for repairing the several Roads leading into the City of Hereford. (Repealed by Hereford Roads Act 1810 (50 Geo. 3. c. lxxiii))
| Isle of Ely Drainage (No. 2) Act 1748 | 22 Geo. 2. c. 19 | 26 May 1749 |
An Act for the more effectual draining and preserving the several Fen Lands and Field Lands, in the Bounds and Precincts of Whittlesey, in the Isle of Ely, in the County of Cambridge.
| Bristol, Paving, etc. Act 1748 | 22 Geo. 2. c. 20 | 26 May 1749 |
An Act for making more effectual an Act passed in the Eleventh and Twelfth Years of the Reign of King William the Third, (Note: Bristol Roads and Avon and Frome Navigation Act 1698 (11 Will. 3. c. 23)) for the better preserving the Navigation of the Rivers Avon and Froome, and for cleansing, paving, and enlightening, the Streets of the City of Bristol, so far as the same Act relates to the paving and enlightening the said Streets, and for the regulating Hackney Coachmen, Halliers, Draymen, and Carters, and the Markets and Sellers of Hay and Straw, within the said City and Liberties thereof.
| Ministers' Widows Fund (Scotland) Act 1748 (repealed) | 22 Geo. 2. c. 21 | 26 May 1749 |
An Act for explaining and amending an Act passed in the Seventeenth Year of His present Majesty's Reign, intituled, "An Act for raising and establishing a Fund, for a Provision for the Widows and Children of the Ministers of the Church of Scotland, and of the Heads, Principals, and Masters, of the Universities of Saint Andrews, Glasgow, and Edinburgh." (Note: Ministers' Widows Fund (Scotland) Act 1743 (17 Geo. 2. c. 11)) (Repealed by Ministers' Widows Fund (Scotland) Act 1779 (19 Geo. 3. c. 20))
| Weymouth Harbour Act 1748 (repealed) | 22 Geo. 2. c. 22 | 26 May 1749 |
An Act for the better ascertaining, recovering, and collecting, certain Duties, commonly called Petty Customs, or Wharfage, payable upon the Importation and Exportation of Goods and Merchandizes into or out of the Harbour of the Borough and Town of Waymouth and Melcombe Regis, in the County of Dorset, and also of Ballast and Harbour Duties, payable in respect of Ships and Vessels coming into and going out of the said Harbour, and for the better repairing, and keeping in Repair, the said Harbour, and the Wharfs and other public Buildings and Works within the said Borough and Town. (Repealed by Weymouth and Melcombe Regis Bridge Act 1820 (1 Geo. 4. c. xl) and Weymouth and Melcombe Regis Harbour and Bridge Act 1825 (6 Geo. 4. c. cxvi))
| National Debt Act 1748 (repealed) | 22 Geo. 2. c. 23 | 26 May 1749 |
An Act to charge the Sinking Fund with the Payment of Annuities, in Discharge of Navy, Victualing, and Transport Bills, and Ordnance Debentures, to the Amount therein mentioned. (Repealed by Statute Law Revision Act 1870 (33 & 34 Vict. c. 69))
| Hue and Cry Act 1748 (repealed) | 22 Geo. 2. c. 24 | 26 May 1749 |
An Act for remedying Inconveniencies which may happen by Proceedings in Actions on the Statutes of Hue and Cry. (Repealed for England and Wales by Criminal Statutes Repeal Act 1827 (7 & 8 Geo. 4. c. 27) and for India by Criminal Law (India) Act 1828 (9 Geo. 4. c. 74))
| Post Office Act 1748 (repealed) | 22 Geo. 2. c. 25 | 26 May 1749 |
An Act to explain and amend so much of an Act made in the Ninth Year of the Reign of Queen Anne, intituled, "An Act for establishing a General Post office for all Her Majesty's Dominions, and for settling a Weekly Sum, out of the Revenues thereof, for the Service of the War, and other Her Majesty's Occasions," (Note: Post Office (Revenues) Act 1710 (9 Ann. c. 11)) as relates to Horses or Furniture to be let to Persons riding Post. (Repealed by Post Office (Repeal of Laws) Act 1837 (7 Will. 4 & 1 Vict. c. 32))
| Hereford Roads (No. 3) Act 1748 (repealed) | 22 Geo. 2. c. 26 | 26 May 1749 |
An Act for repairing and widening the several Roads leading into the Town of Ross, in the County of Hereford. (Repealed by Roads in Staffordshire Act 1814 (55 Geo. 3. c. lxi))
| Frauds by Workmen Act 1748 (repealed) | 22 Geo. 2. c. 27 | 26 May 1749 |
An Act for the more effectual preventing of Frauds and Abuses committed by Persons employed in the Manufacture of Hats, and in the Woollen, Linen, Fustian, Cotton, Iron, Leather, Fur, Hemp, Flax, Mohair, and Silk Manufactures; and for preventing unlawful Combinations of Journeymen Dyers and Journeymen Hotpressers, and of all Persons employed in the said several Manufactures, and for the better Payment of their Wages. (Repealed by Theft Act 1968 (c. 60))
| Bristol Roads Act 1748 (repealed) | 22 Geo. 2. c. 28 | 26 May 1749 |
An Act for continuing Two Acts of Parliament, the One, passed in the Thirteenth Year of the Reign of His late Majesty King George the First, (Note: Bristol Roads Act 1726 (13 Geo. 1. c. 12)) for amending the several Roads leading from the City of Bristol, and the other, passed in the Fourth Year of the Reign of His present Majesty, (Note: Bristol Roads Act 1730 (4 Geo. 2. c. 22)) to explain and amend the same Act, and for making the said Acts more effectual, and also for repairing other Roads therein mentioned. (Repealed by Bristol Roads Act 1779 (19 Geo. 3. c. 117))
| Argyllshire Valuation Act 1748 (repealed) | 22 Geo. 2. c. 29 | 26 May 1749 |
An Act for making an authentic Roll of Valuation for the Shire of Argyll. (Repealed by Statute Law (Repeals) Act 1975 (c. 10))
| Settlement of Moravians in America Act 1748 (repealed) | 22 Geo. 2. c. 30 | 26 May 1749 |
An Act for encouraging the People known by the Name of Unitas Fratrum, or United Brethren, to settle in His Majesty's Colonies in America. (Repealed by Statute Law Revision Act 1887 (50 & 51 Vict. c. 59))
| Southwark Roads Act 1748 (repealed) | 22 Geo. 2. c. 31 | 26 May 1749 |
An Act for opening and making a new Road from the East End of New Street, in the Parish of Saint John, Southwark, to and through the several Places therein mentioned, and for keeping the said Road in Repair for the future. (Repealed by Roads in Bermondsey, Rotherhithe and Deptford Act 1823 (4 Geo. 4. c. lxxxiv))
| Boroughbridge and Durham Road Act 1748 (repealed) | 22 Geo. 2. c. 32 | 26 May 1749 |
An Act for enlarging the Term and Powers granted by an Act passed in the Eighteenth Year of the Reign of His present Majesty, (Note: Boroughbridge and Durham Road Act 1744 (18 Geo. 2. c. 8)) for repairing the High Road leading from Boroughbridge, in the County of York, through North Allerton, in the same County, to Croft Bridge, on the River Tees, and from thence, through Darlington, in the County of Durham, to the City of Durham, and for making the same more effectual. (Repealed by Boroughbridge and Durham Road Act 1792 (32 Geo. 3. c. 118))
| Navy Act 1748 or the Consolidation Act 1749 (repealed) | 22 Geo. 2. c. 33 | 26 May 1749 |
An Act for amending, explaining, and reducing into One Act of Parliament, the Laws relating to the Government of His Majesty's Ships, Vessels, and Forces by Sea. (Repealed by Naval Discipline Act 1860 (23 & 24 Vict. c. 123))
| Isle of Ely Roads Act 1748 (repealed) | 22 Geo. 2. c. 34 | 26 May 1749 |
An Act for enlarging the Term and Powers granted by an Act made in the Third Year of the Reign of His present Majesty, intituled, "An Act for making a new Road, and for repairing and amending the ancient Road, between the Towns of Wisbech and March, in the Isle of Ely and County of Cambridge." (Note: Cambridgeshire Roads Act 1729 (3 Geo. 2. c. 24)) (Repealed by Isle of Ely and Norfolk Roads Act 1766 (7 Geo. 3. c. 100))
| Surrey and Sussex Roads Act 1748 (repealed) | 22 Geo. 2. c. 35 | 26 May 1749 |
An Act for repairing and widening the Road leading from the Town of Kingston upon Thames, in the County of Surry, to a Place called Sheetbridge, near Petersfield, in the County of Southampton, and also the Road from Hindhead Heath, through Fernhurst Lane and Midhurst, to the City of Chichester, in the County of Sussex. (Repealed by Road from Kingston-upon-Thames to Sheetbridge Act 1803 (43 Geo. 3. c. cxi))
| Importation Act 1748 (repealed) | 22 Geo. 2. c. 36 | 26 May 1749 |
An Act for the more effectual preventing the Importation and Wear of Foreign Embroidery and Brocade, and of Gold and Silver Thread, Lace, or other Work made of Gold or Silver Wire, manufactured in Foreign Parts. (Repealed by Customs Law Repeal Act 1825 (6 Geo. 4. c. 105))
| Taxation Act (No. 3) 1748 (repealed) | 22 Geo. 2. c. 37 | 26 May 1749 |
An Act for the better securing His Majesty's Duties upon Coal, Culm, and Cinders, exported beyond Sea. (Repealed by Customs Law Repeal Act 1825 (6 Geo. 4. c. 105))
| Keeping, etc., of Gunpowder Act 1748 (repealed) | 22 Geo. 2. c. 38 | 26 May 1749 |
An Act to prevent the Mischiefs which may happen by keeping too great Quantities of Gunpowder in any one Place, or carrying too great Quantities of Gunpowder together from one Place to another. (Repealed by Keeping, etc., of Gunpowder Act 1771 (11 Geo. 3. c. 35))
| Boroughbridge, Catterick and Piersebridge Road Act 1748 (repealed) | 22 Geo. 2. c. 39 | 26 May 1749 |
An Act for enlarging the Powers granted by an Act, passed in the Sixteenth Year of the Reign of His present Majesty, (Note: Boroughbridge, Catterick and Piersebridge Road Act 1742 (16 Geo. 2. c. 7)) for repairing the Road from Boroughbridge, in the County of York, to Catherick, in the same County, and from thence to Piersbridge, on the River Tees. (Repealed by Boroughbridge, Catterick and Piersbridge Road Act 1825 (6 Geo. 4. c. ix))
| Ramsgate and Sandwich Harbours Act 1748 (repealed) | 22 Geo. 2. c. 40 | 26 May 1749 |
An Act for enlarging and maintaining the Harbour of Ramsgate, and for cleansing, amending, and preserving, the Haven of Sandwich. (Repealed by Ramsgate Harbour and Sandwich Act 1792 (32 Geo. 3. c. 74))
| Land Tax (Commissioners) Act 1748 (repealed) | 22 Geo. 2. c. 41 | 13 June 1749 |
An Act for rectifying Mistakes in the Names of several of the Commissioners appointed to put in Execution the Act for granting a Land Tax for the Year One Thousand Seven Hundred and Forty-eight; and for appointing other Commissioners, together with those named in the said Act, to put in Execution an Act for granting a Land Tax for the Year One Thousand Seven Hundred and Forty-nine, and for directing the Names of Collectors of the said Tax to be certified to the Receivers General, and for Relief of the Borough of Honiton, as to Arrears of the Land Tax, and the House and Window Taxes, for the Years One Thousand Seven Hundred and Forty-seven and One Thousand Seven Hundred and Forty-eight. (Repealed by Statute Law Revision Act 1867 (30 & 31 Vict. c. 59))
| Supply, etc. Act 1748 (repealed) | 22 Geo. 2. c. 42 | 13 June 1749 |
An Act for granting to His Majesty the Sum of One Million, out of the Sinking Fund, for the Service of the Year One Thousand Seven Hundred and Forty-nine, and for enabling His Majesty to raise a further Sum of One Million, for the Uses and Purposes therein mentioned, and for further appropriating the Supplies granted in this Session of Parliament, and for applying a certain Sum, for defraying certain Charges and Allowances to the Officers and Private Gentlemen of the Reduced Troops of Horse Guards, and for continuing the Bounties on the Exportation of British and Irish Linens, and for making forth Duplicates of Exchequer Bills, Lottery Tickets, Receipts, Annuity Orders, or other Orders, lost, burnt, or otherwise destroyed. (Repealed by Statute Law Revision Act 1867 (30 & 31 Vict. c. 59))
| Worcestershire Roads Act 1748 (repealed) | 22 Geo. 2. c. 43 | 13 June 1749 |
An Act for the further enlarging the Term and Powers granted and continued by Two Acts of Parliament, the One passed in the Twelfth Year of the Reign of His late Majesty King George the First, (Note: Worcester Roads Act 1725 (12 Geo. 1. c. 14)) for repairing the Roads from the City of Worcester, through the Borough of Droitwich, to Dyers Bridge, near Bromsgrove, in the County of Worcester, and also for repairing the Roads from Dyer's Bridge, through the Town of Bromsgrove, to Spadesbourn Bridge, and from Droitwich to Bradley Brook, in the same County. (Repealed by Worcester Roads Act 1793 (33 Geo. 3. c. 175))
| Discharged Soldiers, etc. Act 1748 (repealed) | 22 Geo. 2. c. 44 | 13 June 1749 |
An Act to enable such Officers, Mariners, and Soldiers, as have been in His Majesty's Service since His Accession to the Throne, to exercise Trades. (Repealed by Statute Law Revision Act 1867 (30 & 31 Vict. c. 59))
| Whale Fishery Act 1748 (repealed) | 22 Geo. 2. c. 45 | 13 June 1749 |
An Act for the further Encouragement and Enlargement of the Whale Fishery, and for continuing such Laws as are therein mentioned relating thereto, and for the Naturalization of such Foreign Protestants as shall serve, for the Time therein mentioned, on Board such Ships as shall be fitted out for the said Fishery. (Repealed by Statute Law Revision Act 1867 (30 & 31 Vict. c. 59))
| Continuance of Laws, etc. Act 1748 (repealed) | 22 Geo. 2. c. 46 | 13 June 1749 |
An Act to continue several Laws, for preventing Exactions of the Occupiers of Locks and Wears upon the River Thames Westward, and for ascertaining the Rates of Water Carriage upon the said River, and for continuing, explaining, and amending, the several Laws for the better Regulation of Attornies and Solicitors, and for regulating the Price and Assize of Bread, and for preventing the spreading of the Distemper amongst the Horned Cattle, and also for making further Regulations with respect to Attornies and Solicitors, and for further preventing the spreading of the Distemper amongst the Horned Cattle, and for the more frequent Return of Writs in the Counties Palatine of Chester and Lancaster, and for ascertaining the Method of levying Writs of Execution against the Inhabitants of Hundreds, and for allowing Quakers to make Affirmation, in Cases where an Oath is or shall be required. (Repealed by Statute Law Revision Act 1871 (34 & 35 Vict. c. 116))
| Small Debts, Southwark, etc. Act 1748 (repealed) | 22 Geo. 2. c. 47 | 13 June 1749 |
An Act for the more easy and speedy Recovery of small Debts, within the Town and Borough of Southwark, and the several Parishes of Saint Saviour, Saint Mary at Newington, Saint Mary Magdalen Bermondsey, Christ Church, Saint Mary Lambeth, and Saint Mary at Rotherhith, in the County of Surry, and the several Precincts and Liberties of the same. (Repealed by Southwark Court of Requests Act 1823 (4 Geo. 4. c. cxxiii) and County Courts Act 1846 (9 & 10 Vict. c. 95))
| Treason Outlawries (Scotland) Act 1748 (repealed) | 22 Geo. 2. c. 48 | 13 June 1749 |
An Act to ascertain and establish the Method of proceeding to and upon Outlawries for High Treason and Misprision of High Treason, in Scotland. (Repealed by Statute Law (Repeals) Act 1977 (c. 18))
| Fish Market, Westminster Act 1748 (repealed) | 22 Geo. 2. c. 49 | 13 June 1749 |
An Act for making a free Market for the Sale of Fish, in the City of Westminster, and for preventing the Forestalling and Monopolizing of Fish, and for allowing the Sale of Fish under the Dimensions mentioned in a Clause contained in an Act of the First Year of His late Majesty's Reign, (Note: Fish Act 1714 (1 Geo. 1. St. 2. c. 18)) in case the same are taken with a Hook. (Repealed by Statute Law Revision Act 1867 (30 & 31 Vict. c. 59))
| Shoreditch Lighting and Watching Act 1748 (repealed) | 22 Geo. 2. c. 50 | 13 June 1749 |
An Act for the better repairing the Highways and cleansing the Streets within the Parish of Saint Leonard, Shoreditch, in the County of Middlesex, and for better enlightening the open Places, Streets, Lanes, Passages, and Courts, there, and regulating the Nightly Watch and Beadles within the said Parish. (Repealed by London Government (Borough of Shoreditch) Order in Council 1901 (SR&O 1901/221))
| Stockton to Barnard Castle Road Act 1748 (repealed) | 22 Geo. 2. c. 51 | 13 June 1749 |
An Act for enlarging the Term and Powers granted by an Act passed in the Twentieth Year of the Reign of His present Majesty, (Note: Stockton to Barnard Castle Road Act 1746 (20 Geo. 2. c. 25)) for repairing the High Road leading from the Town of Stockton upon Tees to Darlington, and from thence, through Winston, to Barnard Castle, in the same County, and for the effectual amending of the same. (Repealed by Stockton-upon-Tees, Darlington and Barnard Castle Road Act 1805 (45 Geo. 3. c. xvii))
| Crown Lands (Forfeited Estates) Act 1748 (repealed) | 22 Geo. 2. c. 52 | 13 June 1749 |
An Act for vesting the several Estates of James late Earl of Derwentwater and Charles Radcliffe, deceased, comprized in several Settlements therein mentioned, in Trustees, for an absolute Estate of Inheritance, for the Benefit of the Royal Hospital at Greenwich, and for raising certain Sums of Money, out of Part of the said Estates, for the Relief of the Children of the said Charles Radcliffe. (Repealed by Statute Law Revision Act 1948 (11 & 12 Geo. 6. c. 62))

=== Private acts ===
| Short title | Citation | Royal assent |
Long title
| East Woodhey and Hollington (Hampshire) Inclosure Act 1748 | 22 Geo. 2. c. 1 Pr. | 16 February 1749 |
An Act for enclosing and dividing East Woodhey Down, and the Open and Common Fields of East Woodhey and Hollington, in the County of Southampton, pursuant to an Agreement entered into for that Purpose.
| Whitwell's Name Act 1748 | 22 Geo. 2. c. 2 Pr. | 16 February 1749 |
An Act for enabling John Griffin Whitwell Esquire and his Issue to take and use the Surname and Arms of Griffin.
| Grundy's Name Act 1748 | 22 Geo. 2. c. 3 Pr. | 16 February 1749 |
An Act to enable Samuel Grundy (now called Samuel Swinfen) and the Heirs Male of his Body to take and use the Surname and Arms of Swinfen.
| Naturalization of Klencke, Grand and Colombies Act 1748 | 22 Geo. 2. c. 4 Pr. | 16 February 1749 |
An Act for naturalizing Martin Klencke, John James Grand, and Anthony Colombies.
| Guillon's Naturalization Act 1748 | 22 Geo. 2. c. 5 Pr. | 16 February 1749 |
An Act for naturalizing Gabriel Guillon.
| Confirming an order and rule of Court of Common Pleas for assessing lands in the manor of Betlow, to parochial rates and levies of and in Tring (Hertfordshire). | 22 Geo. 2. c. 6 Pr. | 22 March 1749 |
An Act for confirming an Order and Rule of the Court of Common Pleas, for assessing certain Lands and Tenements, in the Manor of Betlow, to the Parochial Rates and Levies of and in the Parish of Tring, in the County of Hertford.
| Wakerley and Wittering Inclosure Act 1748 | 22 Geo. 2. c. 7 Pr. | 22 March 1749 |
An Act for confirming and establishing an Agreement for dividing and enclosing certain Open Fields and Lands, in the Manors of Wakerley and Wittering, in the County of Northampton.
| Norton juxta Twicross Inclosure Act 1748 | 22 Geo. 2. c. 8 Pr. | 22 March 1749 |
An Act for confirming Articles of Agreement and in Award, for enclosing and dividing the Heaths, Wastes, Fields, and Common Grounds, in the Township of Norton juxta Twecross, in the County of Leicester.
| Settling a yearly payment to rector of Broughton (Buckinghamshire) for time being, in lieu of tithes. | 22 Geo. 2. c. 9 Pr. | 22 March 1749 |
An Act for settling a certain Yearly Payment to the Rector of Broughton, in the County of Bucks, for the Time being, in Lieu of Tithes, and for other Purposes therein mentioned.
| Luther's Estate Act 1748 | 22 Geo. 2. c. 10 Pr. | 22 March 1749 |
An Act for explaining and amending a Power given by the Marriage Settlement of Richard Luther Esquire and Charlotte his Wife, and for making the same more effectual, for the Benefit of the Children of that Marriage.
| Roger's Estate Act 1748 | 22 Geo. 2. c. 11 Pr. | 22 March 1749 |
An Act for empowering the Committee of the Estate of John Rogers Esquire, a Lunatick, to make Surrenders and Leases of the Freehold and Leasehold Estates of the said Lunatick, during his Lunacy.
| Scudamore's Name Act 1748 | 22 Geo. 2. c. 12 Pr. | 22 March 1749 |
An Act to enable and oblige Charles Fitz Roy Esquire and Frances his Wife, and the Issue of her Body, to take and use the additional Surname and bear the Arms of Scudamore.
| Kimpson's Name Act 1748 | 22 Geo. 2. c. 13 Pr. | 22 March 1749 |
An Act for authorizing and empowering Thomas Harrison to take and use the Surname of Kimpson, in Performance of a Condition contained in the Will of Thomas Kimpson Clerk, deceased.
| Barham's Name Act 1748 | 22 Geo. 2. c. 14 Pr. | 22 March 1749 |
An Act to enable Joseph Foster Barham Esquire and his Issue to take and use the Surname of Barham, pursuant to the Will of Henry Barham Esquire, deceased.
| Rash's Divorce Act 1748 | 22 Geo. 2. c. 15 Pr. | 22 March 1749 |
An Act to dissolve the Marriage of Samuel Rash Gentleman with Dorothy Fuller his now Wife, and to enable him to marry again, and for other Purposes therein mentioned.
| Naturalization of Renner and Pritzler Act 1748 | 22 Geo. 2. c. 16 Pr. | 22 March 1749 |
An Act for naturalizing George William Renner and Christopher Frederick Pritzler.
| Aldworth's Naturalization Act 1748 | 22 Geo. 2. c. 17 Pr. | 22 March 1749 |
An Act for naturalizing Magdalen Aldworth.
| Courant's Naturalization Act 1748 | 22 Geo. 2. c. 18 Pr. | 22 March 1749 |
An Act for naturalizing Charles Louis Courant.
| Divesting Crown of reversion in fee simple of manors of Spalding and Holbech and connected lands in Lincolnshire and of ground and buildings in Saint Martin in the Fields (Middlesex), expectant on certain estates tail, and for vesting them in persons therein named for intent the same may be barred by proper methods of law. | 22 Geo. 2. c. 19 Pr. | 26 May 1749 |
An Act for divesting the Crown of the Reversion in Fee Simple of and in the Manors of Spalding and Holbech, and of several Lands, Tenements, and Hereditaments, to the same belonging, in the County of Lincoln, and of and in a Piece or Parcel of Ground, in the Parish of Saint Martin in the Fields, in the County of Middlesex, and the Buildings thereon, expectant on certain Estates Tail, and for vesting the same in certain other Persons therein named, to the Intent the same may be barred, by proper Methods in Law, for the Purposes therein mentioned.
| Earl of Peterborough's Estate Act 1748 | 22 Geo. 2. c. 20 Pr. | 26 May 1749 |
An Act to enable Charles Earl of Peterborow, or the other Heirs of Entail, to sell Lands in the Counties of Kincarden and Aberdeen, for Payment of Debts charged thereupon, and other Purposes therein mentioned.
| Bishopric of London Estate Act 1748 | 22 Geo. 2. c. 21 Pr. | 26 May 1749 |
An Act to enable the Bishop of London, or his Successors, to demise or sell the Capital Messuage, or Mansion-house, called London House, for the Benefit of the Bishopric of London.
| Bishop of Salisbury's Personal Estate Act 1748 | 22 Geo. 2. c. 22 Pr. | 26 May 1749 |
An Act for applying Part of the Personal Estate of Gilbert late Lord Bishop of Salisbury, for the purchasing of Lands or Rents in Perpetuity, in Scotland, to be settled to several Charitable Uses and Purposes in his Will mentioned.
| Powell's Estate Act 1748 | 22 Geo. 2. c. 23 Pr. | 26 May 1749 |
An Act for confirming and establishing an Agreement between Henry Lord Teynham and Sir Francis Curson Baronet, for a Partition of the Estate of John Powel Esquire, deceased and for rendering the said Agreement more effectual for the Purposes thereby intended, and for other Purposes therein mentioned.
| Viscount Vane's Estate Act 1748 | 22 Geo. 2. c. 24 Pr. | 26 May 1749 |
An Act for raising Money upon the settled Estate of William Lord Viscount Vane, for the Payment of his Debts.
| Viscount Fane's Estate Act 1748 | 22 Geo. 2. c. 25 Pr. | 26 May 1749 |
An Act for Sale of the Inheritance of Part of the settled Estate of Charles Lord Viscount Fane, in the County of Devon, and in the County of Limerick in the Kingdom of Ireland, for discharging Debts and Encumbrances, and also for settling another Estate, in the County of Berks, in Lieu thereof, and for securing a Rent Charge to Mary Viscountess Fane, as a Compensation for her Estate for Life in the Premises in the County of Devon.
| Vyvyan's Estate Act 1748 | 22 Geo. 2. c. 26 Pr. | 26 May 1749 |
An Act to enable the making of Leases and Setts of Mines of the Estates of Sir Richard Vyvyan Baronet, an Infant, in the Counties of Cornwall and Devon, during his Minority.
| Williams' Estate Act 1748 | 22 Geo. 2. c. 27 Pr. | 26 May 1749 |
An Act for selling the Manors, Advowson, Rectory, Woods, Lands, and Hereditaments, devised by the Will of Sir John Williams Knight, deceased, for the Purposes therein mentioned, and for laying out the Money arising by such Sale in the Purchase of other Lands and Hereditaments, to be settled in Lieu thereof.
| Levinz's Estate Act 1748 | 22 Geo. 2. c. 28 Pr. | 26 May 1749 |
An Act for discharging the Estate of William Levinz Esquire, in Bilby, Ranby, and Stiriop, in the County of Nottingham, from a Yearly Payment of Thirty Pounds, given by Sir Creswell Levinz Knight for Charitable Uses, and for charging the same on his Estate at Grove, in the same County.
| Marlow's Estate Act 1748 | 22 Geo. 2. c. 29 Pr. | 26 May 1749 |
An Act for vesting the undivided Fifth Part of divers Lands and Hereditaments, in the County of Sussex, the Estate of Ebenezer Marlow and William Marlow his Son, an Infant, in Trustees, in Trust, to sell the same, for the Purposes therein mentioned.
| Cotton's Estate Act 1748 | 22 Geo. 2. c. 30 Pr. | 26 May 1749 |
An Act for vesting Part of the settled Estate of Nathaniel Cotton, Doctor in Physic, lying in the County of Hertford, in Trustees, in Trust to sell the same, and to lay out the Money arising by such Sale in the Purchase of another Estate, to be settled to the Uses of his Marriage Settlement.
| Lockwood's Estate Act 1748 | 22 Geo. 2. c. 31 Pr. | 26 May 1749 |
An Act for vesting the Inheritance of the Real Estate late of John Lockwood Gentleman, deceased, in Trustees, for the Payment of the Encumbrances charged upon the same by virtue of, and under, his Will.
| Glynn's Estate Act 1748 | 22 Geo. 2. c. 32 Pr. | 26 May 1749 |
An Act for Sale of Part of the settled Estate of Nicholes Glynn Esquire, deceased, for discharging Encumbrances; and for other Purposes therein mentioned.
| Hawksworth's Estate Act 1748 | 22 Geo. 2. c. 33 Pr. | 26 May 1749 |
An Act for vesting the settled Estate of Walter Hawksworth Esquire, in the County of York, in him and his Heirs, and for settling the Manor of Hawksworth, in the same County, in Lieu thereof, to the like Uses.
| Lytton's Estate Act 1748 | 22 Geo. 2. c. 34 Pr. | 26 May 1749 |
An Act for disposing of Part of the Real Estate of William Robinson Lytton Esquire, deceased, directed by his Will to be sold, for raising Portions for his Daughters, in order to discharge Encumbrances affecting the same, and for other Purposes therein mentioned.
| Gwyn's Estate Act 1748 | 22 Geo. 2. c. 35 Pr. | 26 May 1749 |
An Act for Sale of Part of the Estate of Francis Gwyn Esquire, in the County of Devon, for raising Money to discharge his Sisters Portions, and other Encumbrances affecting the same, and for other Purposes therein mentioned.
| Middleton's Estate Act 1748 | 22 Geo. 2. c. 36 Pr. | 26 May 1749 |
An Act for Sale of a Messuage, and certain Freehold and Copyhold Lands and Hereditaments, in Twickenham, in the County of Middlesex, the Estate of Mary Middleton Widow and others, and for vesting the Money arising thereby in Trustees, for the same Uses to which the said Estate now stands settled.
| Watlington Inclosure Act 1748 | 22 Geo. 2. c. 37 Pr. | 26 May 1749 |
An Act for enclosing and dividing certain Commons and Wastes, within the Manor and Parish of Watlington, in the County of Norfolk.
| Blosse's Name Act 1748 | 22 Geo. 2. c. 38 Pr. | 26 May 1749 |
An Act to enable Robert Lynch Esquire to assume and take upon him the Name of Blosse.
| Kemp's Naturalization Act 1748 | 22 Geo. 2. c. 39 Pr. | 26 May 1749 |
An Act for naturalizing Frederick Christopher Kempe.
| Auriol's Naturalization Act 1748 | 22 Geo. 2. c. 40 Pr. | 26 May 1749 |
An Act for naturalizing Peter Auriol.
| Viscount Dillon's Estate Act 1748 | 22 Geo. 2. c. 41 Pr. | 13 June 1749 |
An Act for Sale of several Estates, in the Counties of Mayo and Roscommon, in the Kingdom of Ireland, belonging to Henry late Lord Viscount Dillon, for Payment of Debts, and other Purposes therein mentioned.
| Lady Lymington's Estate Act 1748 | 22 Geo. 2. c. 42 Pr. | 13 June 1749 |
An Act for selling the settled Estate of Catherine commonly called Lady Lymington, for discharging several Debts and Encumbrances, and for other Purposes therein mentioned.
| Raymond's Estate Act 1748 | 22 Geo. 2. c. 43 Pr. | 13 June 1749 |
An Act for Sale of Part of the settled Estate of John Raymond, a Bankrupt, and for applying Part of the Money arising by such Sale, as Part of the said Bankrupt's Estate, liable to Distribution amongst his Creditors, and for laying out the Residue in the Purchase of another Estate, to be settled as therein is mentioned.
| Mansfield's Estates Act 1748 | 22 Geo. 2. c. 44 Pr. | 13 June 1749 |
An Act for Sale of divers Lands and Tenements, in Twickenham, in the County of Middlesex, devised by the Will of Paul Mansfield, deceased, pursuant to an Agreement for that Purpose, and for the Benefit of his Grandchildren.
| Broad Blunsdon Inclosure Act 1748 | 22 Geo. 2. c. 45 Pr. | 13 June 1749 |
An Act for confirming and establishing certain Articles of Agreement, for enclosing and dividing the Common Fields and Common Grounds, in the Tithing of Broad Blunsdon, in the County of Wilts, and making the same more effectual for the Purposes therein mentioned.
| Annexing rectory of Glaston (Rutlandshire) to office of master/keeper of house/college of Saint Peter at Cambridge University. | 22 Geo. 2. c. 46 Pr. | 13 June 1749 |
An Act for annexing the Rectory of Glaston, in the County of Rutland, to the Office of Master or Keeper of the House or College of Saint Peter, in the University of Cambridge.
| Brereton's Name Act 1748 | 22 Geo. 2. c. 47 Pr. | 13 June 1749 |
An Act for authorizing and empowering Thomas Brereton Esquire and his Heirs to take and use the Surname of Salusbury.
| Bowler's Naturalization Act 1748 | 22 Geo. 2. c. 48 Pr. | 13 June 1749 |
An Act for naturalizing Emanuel Bowler.

=== Sources ===
- Pickering, Danby, ed. (1765). The Statutes at Large. Vol. 19 - 20th to the 23rd Year of King George II. Printed by Joseph Bentham – via Internet Archive.
- Pickering, Danby, ed. (1765). The Statutes at Large. Vol. 19 - 20th to the 23rd Year of King George II – via Google Books.
- Journals of the House of Commons. Vol. 25. London: His Majesty's Stationery Office. 1803. pp. 662–890 – via Google Books.
- Chronological Table of and Index to the Statutes. Vol. 1: To the End of the Session 59 Vict. Sess. 2 (1895) (13th ed.). London: Her Majesty's Stationery Office. 1896. pp. 111–112 – via Google Books.

== See also ==
- List of acts of the Parliament of Great Britain
