= Treason Act 1708 =

Act of the Parliament of Great Britain

Treason Act 1708 (Note: The citation of this act by this short title was authorised by section 1 of, and the first schedule to, the Short Titles Act 1896. Due to the repeal of those provisions it is now authorised by section 19(2) of the Interpretation Act 1978.)
- Act of Parliament
- Parliament of Great Britain
- Long title: An Act for improving the Union of the Two Kingdoms.
- Citation: 7 Ann. c. 21
- Territorial extent: Great Britain

Dates
- Royal assent: 21 April 1709
- Commencement: 1 July 1709 (Note: Section 1.)
Other legislation
Amends	Treason Act 1547; Coin Act 1696
Amended by	Treason Act 1743; Treason Act 1766; Forfeiture upon Attainder of Treason Act 1799; Juries Act 1825; Forgery Act 1830; Treason (Ireland) Act 1854; Statute Law Revision Act 1867; Statute Law Revision Act 1888; Short Titles Act 1896; Treason Act 1945; Statute Law Revision Act 1948; Criminal Law Act 1967; Statute Law (Repeals) Act 1977; Criminal Justice (Scotland) Act 1980
Relates to	Perpetuation, etc. of Acts 1708; Sheriffs (Scotland) Act 1747; Treason Outlawries (Scotland) Act 1748; Treason Act (Ireland) 1765; Correspondence with Enemies Act 1793

Status: Amended

Text of statute as originally enacted

Revised text of statute as amended

Text of the Treason Act 1708 as in force today (including any amendments) within the United Kingdom, from legislation.gov.uk.

The Treason Act 1708 (7 Ann. c. 21) is an act of the Parliament of Great Britain which harmonised the law of high treason between the former kingdoms of England and Scotland following their union as Great Britain in 1707.

As of 2026 the act is partly still in force in Great Britain.

== Provisions ==
=== Offences ===
Before the act was passed, treason in Scotland consisted of "theft in landed men, murder under trust, wilful fire-raising, firing coalheughs, and assassination." Section 1 of the act abolished these offences and replaced them with the English definition of high treason. The act also applied the English offence of misprision of treason to Scotland. (However it did not extend petty treason to Scotland.)

The act also created new offences of treason. It became treason:

- to counterfeit the Great Seal of Scotland and other Scottish seals (anywhere in Great Britain), and
- to slay the Lords of Session or Lords of Justiciary "sitting in Judgment in the Exercise of their Office within Scotland".

These new offences were similar to existing treasons in England, as in England it was already treason to kill judges or to forge the English seal. (For treason in English law in 1708 and today, see High treason in the United Kingdom.)

Since 1708 treason law in Scotland has generally remained the same as in England. However while the offence of counterfeiting the Seal of Scotland was removed from English treason law in 1861, it is still treason in Scottish law. Also counterfeiting the Great Seal of Great Britain (which was treason under another act) ceased to be treason in England and became a felony in 1861.

When the Scottish Parliament was established in 1998, treason and misprision of treason were designated as reserved matters, meaning they fall outside its jurisdiction.

=== Procedure ===
Section 3 of the act required the Scottish courts to try cases of treason and misprision of treason according to English rules of procedure and evidence.

== Sections still in force ==
The act originally had eleven sections, which were later renumbered one to fourteen. Of the fourteen sections, four survive:

- Section 1 brings Scottish law into line with English law in respect of high treason and misprision of treason.
- Section 5 made the penalties for high treason and misprision of treason in Scotland the same as in England (for details see Treason Act 1814 (54 Geo. 3. c. 146 )).
- Section 11 makes it treason to kill certain Scottish judges.
- Section 12 makes it treason to forge "Her Majesty's Seals appointed by the Twenty-fourth Article of the Union to be kept, used, and continued in Scotland". This list of seals includes the Great Seal of Scotland.

== Subsequent developments ==
Section 12 of the act (so much of the act "as relates relates to forging or counterfeiting the Common Seal of the Governor and Company of the Bank of England or any sealed Bank Bill or any Bank Note or altering or raising any Indorsement on any Bank Bill or Note") was repealed by section 31 of the Forgery Act 1830 (11 Geo. 4 & 1 Will. 4. c. 66) , which came into force on 21 July 1830.

Sections 3 and 6, and section 8 from " Provided ” to end of that section, were repealed by section 1 of, and the schedule to, the Statute Law Revision Act 1867 (30 & 31 Vict. c. 59), which came into force on 15 July 1867.

Sections 2, 4, 9 and 14 of the act were repealed by section 2(2) of, and the schedule to, the Treason Act 1945 (8 & 9 Geo. 6. c. 44), which came into force on 15 June 1945.

In section 5, the words " or attainted ", wherever occurring, and section 8 of the act were repealed by section 1(1) of, and part IV of schedule 1 to, the Statute Law (Repeals) Act 1977, which came into force on 16 June 1977.

== Other treason legislation in 1708 ==
Another act, the Perpetuation, etc. of Acts 1708 (7 Ann. c. 25), amended the Coin Act 1696 (8 & 9 Will. 3. c. 26) (which made it treason to counterfeit coins).

== See also ==
- High treason in the United Kingdom
- Treason Act 1743
- Treason (Ireland) Act 1854
- Treason Act
