= Treason Act 1939 =

Irish legislation

The Treason Act 1939 is an Act of the Oireachtas (Parliament) of Ireland. It provides for the punishment of treason and related offences.

Article 39 of the 1937 Constitution of Ireland defines treason as follows:

Treason shall consist only in levying war against the State, or assisting any State or person or inciting or conspiring with any person to levy war against the State, or attempting by force of arms or other violent means to overthrow the organs of government established by this Constitution, or taking part or being concerned in or inciting or conspiring with any person to make or to take part or be concerned in any such attempt.

Section 1 of the Treason Act provides that treason can be committed by anyone in Ireland, or outside Ireland by any citizen or resident of Ireland. It was a capital offence, until the death penalty was abolished in 1990. The sentence now is life imprisonment, with parole in not less than 40 years.

Section 2 states that anyone who "encourages, harbours, or comforts any person whom he knows or has reasonable grounds for believing to be engaged in committing treason shall be guilty of felony."

The Act also provides that "No person shall be convicted of treason on the uncorroborated evidence of one witness." This also applies to the offence under section 2.

Section 3 deals with misprision of treason.

The 1939 Act replaced the Treasonable Offences Act 1925. Before 1925 treason was defined by the laws of the United Kingdom, most notably the Treason Act 1351.

== See also ==
- Offences against the State Acts 1939–1998
- Treason (Ireland) Act 1854
