= Misprision of treason =

Common law offence

Misprision of treason is an offence found in many common law jurisdictions around the world, having been inherited from English law. It is committed by someone who knows a treason is being or is about to be committed but does not report it to a proper authority.

== Australia ==
Under Australian law a person is guilty of misprision of treason if he:

(a) receives or assists another person who, to his or her knowledge, has committed treason with the intention of allowing him or her to escape punishment or apprehension; or (b) knowing that another person intends to commit treason, does not inform a constable of it within a reasonable time or use other reasonable endeavours to prevent the commission of the offence.

The maximum penalty is life imprisonment.

== Canada ==
Under section 50(1)(b) of the Canadian Criminal Code, a person is guilty of an offence (although it is not described as misprision) if:

knowing that a person is about to commit high treason or treason [he] does not, with all reasonable dispatch, inform a justice of the peace or other peace officer thereof or make other reasonable efforts to prevent that person from committing high treason or treason.

The maximum penalty is 14 years.

== Hong Kong ==
Under section 12(1) of the Safeguarding National Security Ordinance, a Chinese citizen is guilty of misprision of treason if he:

knows that another person has committed, is committing or is about to commit an offence under section 10(1), the person must disclose the commission of offence and the material facts in connection with the commission of offence within the person’s knowledge to a police officer as soon as reasonably practicable after the person knows of the commission of offence, unless the commission of offence has been in the public domain.

The maximum penalty is 14 years. However, section 12(3) states that the section does not affect any claims, rights or entitlements on the ground of legal professional privilege.

== Republic of Ireland ==
Under section 3 of the Treason Act 1939 a person is guilty of misprision of treason if "knowing that any act the commission of which would be treason is intended or proposed to be, or is being, or has been committed, [he] does not forthwith disclose the same, together with all particulars thereof known to him, to a Justice of the District Court, or an officer of the Gárda Síochána, or some other person lawfully engaged on duties relating to the preservation of peace and order."

== New Zealand ==
Section 76(b) of the Crimes Act 1961 provides that any person who "knowing that a person is about to commit treason, fails without reasonable excuse to inform a constable as soon as possible or to use other reasonable efforts to prevent its commission" is guilty of an offence.

A person guilty of this offence is liable to imprisonment for a term not exceeding seven years.

== United Kingdom ==
Misprision of treason is an offence under the common law of England and Wales and the common law of Northern Ireland. By statute, the offence of misprision of treason under the common law of England has been made an offence which is cognisable under the law of Scotland. This offence was formerly known as misprision of high treason in order to distinguish it from misprision of petty treason, before that offence was abolished along with its parent offence in 1828.

The crime is committed where a person knows that treason is being planned or committed and does not report it as soon as he can to a justice of the peace or other authority. The offender does not need to consent to the treason; mere knowledge is enough. Concealment of treason was itself a treason at common law until the Treason Act 1554 deemed it merely misprision of treason, which was a felony.

=== Difference from treason ===
In R v. Tonge (1662) 6 State Tr 225, it was said that:

Where a person knowing of the design meets with the others and hears them discourse of their traitorous designs and says or acts nothing; this is high treason in that party, for it is more than a bare concealment, which is misprision. But if a person not knowing of their design before, come into their company and hear their discourses, and say nothing, and never meet with them again at their consultations, that conduct is only misprision of high treason.

(For more information about the "Tonge Plot", see Intelligence and Espionage in the Reign of Charles II, 1660–1685 (Marshall, 1994)).

Similarly, in R v. Walcott (1683) 9 State Tr 519 at 553, Pemberton, LCJ. said:

For a man to hear of treason accidentally or occasionally and conceal it is but misprision, but if a man will be at consult where treason is hatched and will then conceal it he is guilty of treason therein.

=== Penalty ===
It is punishable by imprisonment for life.

=== Procedure ===
The procedure on trials for misprision of treason is the same as that on trials for murder. It is classified as an indictable-only offence.

=== Limitation ===
A person may not be indicted for misprision of treason committed within the United Kingdom unless the indictment is signed within three years of the commission of that offence.

=== Scottish Parliament ===
Misprision of treason is a reserved matter on which the Scottish Parliament cannot legislate.

== United States ==
In the United States misprision of treason is a federal offense, committed where someone who has knowledge of the commission of any treason against the United States, conceals such knowledge and does not inform the President, a federal judge, a State governor, or a State judge (18 U.S.C. § 2382). It is punishable by a fine and up to seven years in federal prison. It is also a crime punishable under the criminal laws of many states, such as the example of California, below.

=== California ===
Misprision of treason in California consists of:

...the knowledge and concealment of treason, without otherwise assenting to or participating in the crime.

Treason in the aforementioned quote only refers to treason against California, not treason against the United States or any other entity.

The crime is punishable by imprisonment pursuant to subdivision (h) of Section 1170 in a county jail for 16 months, or two or three years.

== See also ==
- Misprision
- Misprision of felony
- Treason
- Compounding treason
