= Caistor Canal =

Canal in Lincolnshire, England

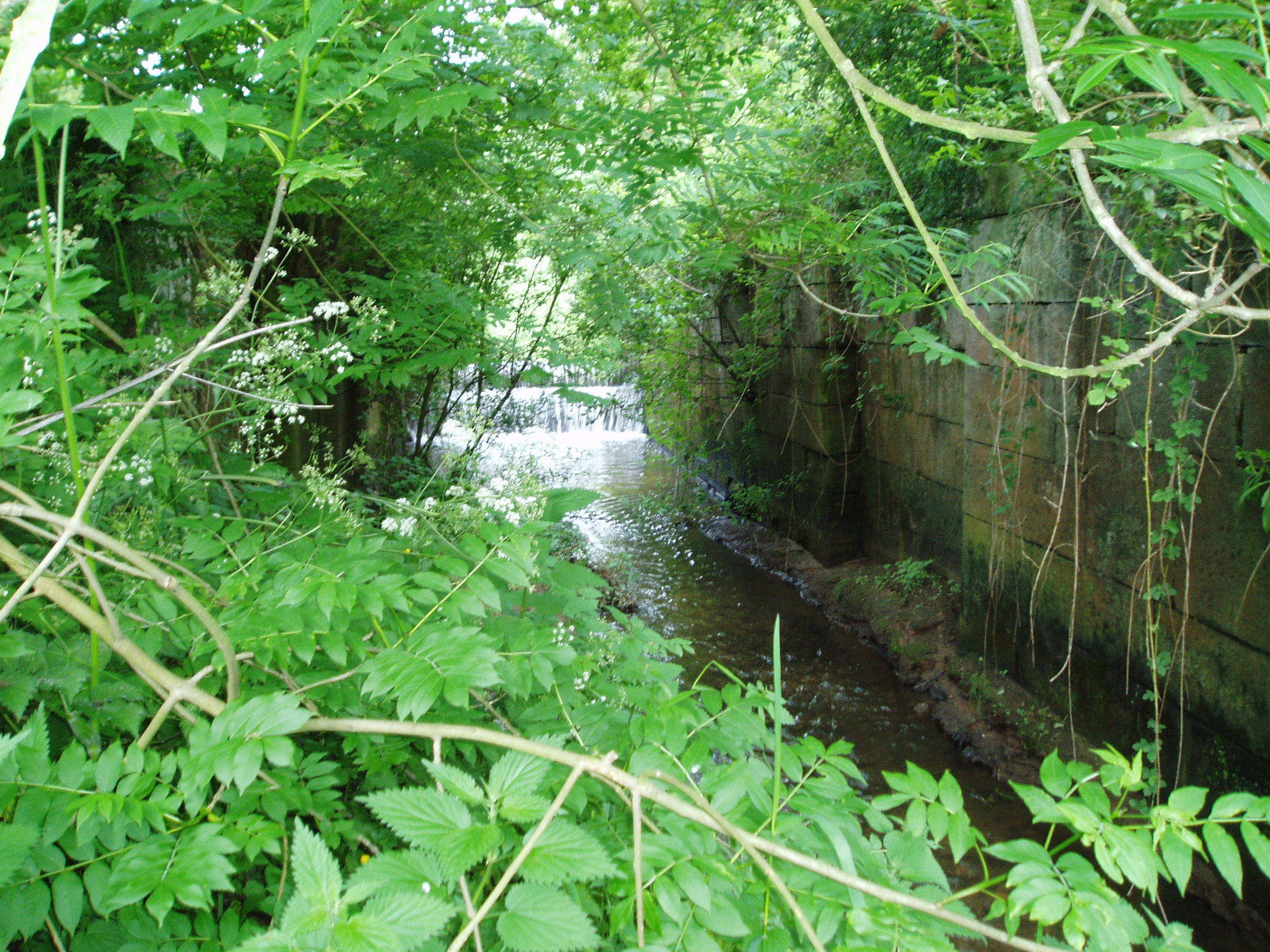
- Water flowing over the weir and through the derelict chamber of Moor lock. The stonework is still in remarkably good condition.

Specifications
- Locks: 6
- Status: Derelict but largely extant

History
- Original owner: Caistor Canal Navigation Company
- Principal engineer: Robert Dickenson
- Date of act: 1793
- Date of first use: 1800
- Date closed: 1855

Geography
- Start point: Moortown
- End point: River Ancholme

The Caistor Canal was a 4-mile (6.4 km) canal in Lincolnshire, England, constructed between 1793 and 1798. It fell into disuse sometime after 1850 and was legally abandoned in 1936. It ran from the River Ancholme, near South Kelsey toward Caistor through six locks, terminating at Moortown, 3.5 miles (5.6 km) away from its intended terminus at Caistor. Parts of it were dredged in 2010, to aid flood defences in South Kelsey.

== History ==
Caistor Canal Act 1793
- Act of Parliament
- Parliament of Great Britain
- Long title: An Act for making and maintaining a Navigable Canal from the River Ancholme, in the Parish of South Kelsey, in the County of Lincoln, into the Parish of Caistor, in the said County.
- Citation: 33 Geo. 3. c. 114
- Territorial extent: Great Britain

Dates
- Royal assent: 3 June 1793
- Commencement: 3 June 1793 (Note: The Acts of Parliament (Commencement) Act 1793.)
- Repealed
Other legislation
Repealed by	Caistor Canal Act Revocation Order 1936

Status: Repealed

Text of statute as originally enacted

Water transport in the vale of the River Ancholme was improved as a result of work carried out between 1767 and 1769. The Caistor Canal was conceived in July 1792 as a feeder to the river, enabling boats to reach the market town of Caistor, some 8 miles (13 km) to the east. An initial meeting was called by a Mr Hall on 3 July 1792, at which it was decided to ask the canal engineer William Jessop to prepare a report. This was considered by the Ancholme Navigation Commissioners in order to assess the risks of flooding caused by the proposal. As they did not oppose the plan, the canal was authorised by an act of Parliament passed on 3 June 1793, the Caistor Canal Act 1793 (33 Geo. 3. c. 114), which created the Caistor Canal Navigation Company, with powers to raise £15,000 in £100 shares to construct the canal, and an additional £10,000 by loan if required. The potential for flooding was to be mitigated by routing the local springs into the head of the canal, and Robert Dickinson acted as engineer for the scheme.

There were six locks, which lowered the level of the canal by 42 feet (13 m). The Caistor Canal Act 1793 authorised the building of the canal to a point near Caistor where a basin was to be built. Under the Caistor enclosure award, being prepared at the same time, a new road was laid out to the site of the proposed basin, but the basin and canal to it were never constructed. Instead, the canal ended 3.5 miles short at the Brigg to Market Rasen road. An entirely new settlement grew up here called Moortown. The canal opened to that point, probably in 1797/8. It is likely that financial problems were the reason for the shorter canal, as the company borrowed £4,600 from Francis Foljambe, one of the principal promoters of the canal and the major landowner on its route. Income from the tolls was not sufficient even to pay the interest, for there were £574 of arrears on the loan by 1813. The treasurer at the time stated that there was no money available to pay £60 for some work which had recently been completed, and there are no records that the loan was repaid.

Soon after it opened, there were proposals to extend the canal to Market Rasen. In May 1801 the canal company announced their intentions to build a canal from the terminal basin at Moortown to Hambleton Hill in Tealby, on the Market Rasen to North Willingham turnpike road. The squire of Holton, William Dixon, paid for a survey of the route, and estimated that it would cost £6,500 to build. A meeting held at the White Hart Inn in Market Rasen was attended by 26 local gentlemen, and they agreed to proceed with the plans. They agreed to meet again in July, but there is no evidence that they did so, and no further action was taken.

The canal appears to have become disused in the 1850s, a few years after the opening of the Market Rasen branch of the Manchester, Sheffield, and Lincolnshire Railway, which came nearer to Caistor than the canal. However some traffic may have continued to South Kelsey, the village at its midpoint, until later in the century. The South Kelsey estate was sold by Mr. Foljombe a few years after the canal opened. The new owner, Mr. Skipworth, and his descendants, were resident owners throughout the nineteenth century. Although the canal company continued to legally exist the canal appears latterly to have been managed as if part of the Skipworth estate, but the nature of the legal arrangement for this, if any, is not recorded. Following the cessation of traffic sometime in the latter half of the nineteenth century, parts of the canal were used for other purposes. Mill Lock, the fourth lock up was used as the site for a watermill, with the wheel occupying the lock chamber. It was built in the 1870s, and was no longer used by 1914. All traces of it have since been removed. The canal became dry above the fifth lock and the stonework of the sixth lock removed entirely before 1883. At some date after all traffic had ceased weirs were built across the locks below South Kelsey. Following the sale of the estate by the Skipworth family in the early years of the twentieth century the canal and its associated drainage system fell entirely out of repair.

In order to restore proper drainage to the surrounding land, the canal was taken over by the Ancholme drainage authority in 1936, after a formal abandonment order, the Caistor Canal Act Revocation Order 1936 (SR&O 1936/1010), had been obtained for the navigation under the Land Drainage Act 1930 (20 & 21 Geo. 5. c. 44).

The canal was a broad canal, with locks 60 feet (18 m) long and 14 feet (4.3 m) wide, and so would have been suitable for the Humber Keels which were used on many of the waterways connected to the Humber.

== Today ==
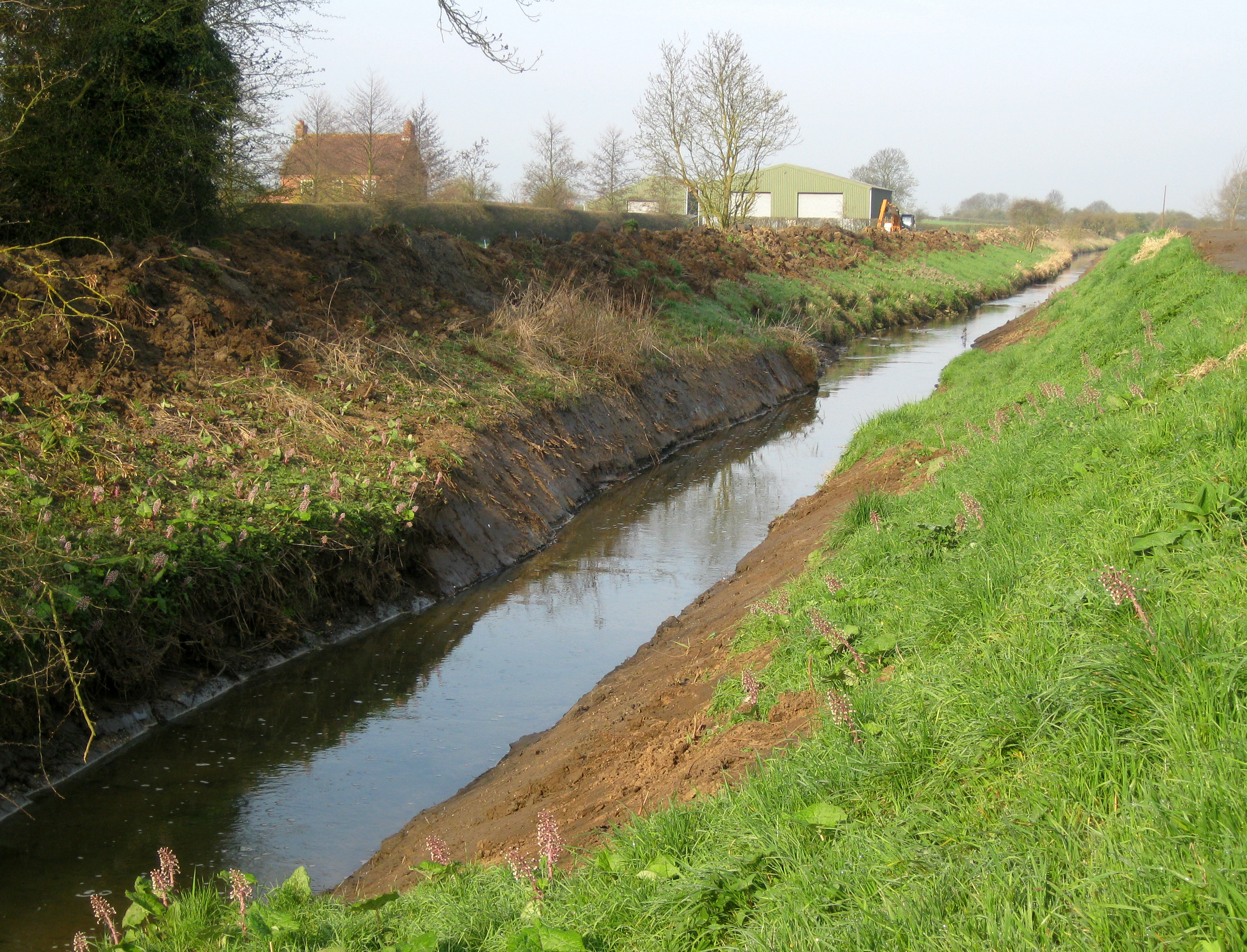
Parts of the channel were dredged in 2010 to improve flood defences.

The canal is no longer navigable, and is maintained by the Environment Agency as a main drainage channel. The remains of the lower five lock chambers and the abutments of the tow-path bridge where the River Ancholme towpath crossed the canal are now grade II listed structures. Despite being closed, two narrowboats successfully reached the first lock in 2002.

As a response to the flooding of homes in South Kelsey during the summer of 2007, the Environment Agency dredged part of the canal to return it to its original depth in March 2010. Around 1 mile (1.6 km) of the bed, between the locks either side of South Kelsey village, was affected by the work, which increases the capacity of the watercourse and reduces the risk of future flooding. The channel had been impeded by several sand bars that had developed, and these were removed as part of the project. Environmental consultants assisted with the work, to ensure that the resident population of water voles were not harmed by the operation.

== Route ==
Point	Coordinates (Links to map resources)	OS Grid Ref	Notes
Junction with River Ancholme	53.478890°N 0.479°W	TF010989	Start of canal
Ings lock	53.4774°N 0.4489°W	TF030989	
Willow lock	53.4776°N 0.4417°W	TF035990	
South Kelsey bridge	53.477°N 0.431°W	TF042989	basin on east side
Mill Lock	53.474°N 0.419°W	TF050986	
Moor Lock	53.472°N 0.408°W	TF057985	
Moortown wharf and lock	53.4772°N 0.3892°W	TF070990	End of canal

== See also ==
- Canals of the United Kingdom
- History of the British canal system

== Bibliography ==
- Acton, R (1982). "The Market Rasen Canal 1801-1980". SLHA Journal. 17. Society for Lincolnshire History and Archaeology.
- Boyes, John; Russell, Ronald (1977). The Canals of Eastern England. David and Charles. ISBN 978-0-7153-7415-3.
- Padley, Christopher (2015). The Caistor Canal. Society for Lincolnshire History and Archaeology. ISBN 978-0-903582-54-4.
- Priestley, Joseph (1831). "Historical Account of the Navigable Rivers, Canals, and Railways, of Great Britain". Archived from the original on 2 April 2016.
- Shead, Jim (2012). "Caistor Canal photos from Chris Padley". Archived from the original on 4 March 2016.
