= List of acts of the Parliament of Great Britain from 1793 =

This is a complete list of acts of the Parliament of Great Britain for the year 1793.

For acts passed until 1707, see the list of acts of the Parliament of England and the list of acts of the Parliament of Scotland. See also the list of acts of the Parliament of Ireland.

For acts passed from 1801 onwards, see the list of acts of the Parliament of the United Kingdom. For acts of the devolved parliaments and assemblies in the United Kingdom, see the list of acts of the Scottish Parliament, the list of acts of the Northern Ireland Assembly, and the list of acts and measures of Senedd Cymru; see also the list of acts of the Parliament of Northern Ireland.

The number shown after each act's title is its chapter number. Acts are cited using this number, preceded by the year(s) of the reign during which the relevant parliamentary session was held; thus the Union with Ireland Act 1800 is cited as "39 & 40 Geo. 3. c. 67", meaning the 67th act passed during the session that started in the 39th year of the reign of George III and which finished in the 40th year of that reign. Note that the modern convention is to use Arabic numerals in citations (thus "41 Geo. 3" rather than "41 Geo. III"). Acts of the last session of the Parliament of Great Britain and the first session of the Parliament of the United Kingdom are both cited as "41 Geo. 3".

Acts passed by the Parliament of Great Britain did not have a short title; however, some of these acts have subsequently been given a short title by acts of the Parliament of the United Kingdom (such as the Short Titles Act 1896).

Before the Acts of Parliament (Commencement) Act 1793 came into force on 8 April 1793, acts passed by the Parliament of Great Britain were deemed to have come into effect on the first day of the session in which they were passed. Because of this, the years given in the list below may in fact be the year before a particular act was passed.

== 33 Geo. 3 ==
The third session of the 17th Parliament of Great Britain, which met from 13 December 1792 until 21 June 1793.

This session was also traditionally cited as 33 G. 3.

=== Public acts ===
Short title	Citation	Royal assent
Long title
Circulation of Notes, etc., Issued in France Act 1793 (repealed)	33 Geo. 3. c. 1	8 January 1793
An Act to prohibit the Circulation of Promissory or other Notes, Orders, Undertakings, or Obligations, for the Payment of any Sum or Sums of Money, or for any other Consideration created and issued under or in the Name of any Public Authority in France. (Repealed by Statute Law Revision Act 1871 (34 & 35 Vict. c. 116))
Exportation Act 1793 (repealed)	33 Geo. 3. c. 2	8 January 1793
An Act to enable His Majesty to restrain the Exportation of Naval Stores, and more effectually to prevent the Exportation of Salt Petre, Arms, and Ammunition, when prohibited by Proclamation or Order in Council. (Repealed by Customs Law Repeal Act 1825 (6 Geo. 4. c. 105) (Note: Incorrectly cited as "4 G 4 c 105" in the Chronological Table of the Statutes.))
Exportation (No. 2) Act 1793 (repealed)	33 Geo. 3. c. 3	8 January 1793
An Act for indemnifying all Persons who have been concerned in advising or carrying into Execution an Order of Council, respecting the Exportation of Wheat and Wheat Flour, for preventing Suits in consequence of the same, and for making further Provisions relative thereto; and also for authorizing His Majesty to prohibit the Exportation of Corn, Meal, Flour, Bread, Biscuit, and Potatoes, and to permit the Importation of Corn, Meal, or Flour on the low Duties. (Repealed by Statute Law Revision Act 1871 (34 & 35 Vict. c. 116))
Aliens Act 1793 or the Regulators of Aliens Act 1793 (repealed)	33 Geo. 3. c. 4	8 January 1793
An Act for establishing Regulations respecting Aliens arriving in this Kingdom, or resident therein in certain Cases. (Repealed by Statute Law Revision Act 1871 (34 & 35 Vict. c. 116))
Debtors Relief Act 1793 (repealed)	33 Geo. 3. c. 5	8 January 1793
An Act for the further Relief of Debtors with respect to the Imprisonment of their Persons, and to oblige Debtors, who shall continue in Execution in Prison beyond a certain Time, and for Sums not exceeding what are mentioned in the Act, to make Discovery of and deliver, upon Oath, their Estates for their Creditors' Benefit. (Repealed by Statute Law Revision Act 1861 (24 & 25 Vict. c. 101))
Marine Mutiny Act 1793 (repealed)	33 Geo. 3. c. 6	28 February 1793
An Act for the Regulation of His Majesty's Marine Forces while on Shore. (Repealed by Statute Law Revision Act 1871 (34 & 35 Vict. c. 116))
Land Tax Act 1793 (repealed)	33 Geo. 3. c. 7	28 February 1793
An Act for granting an Aid to His Majesty, by a Land Tax, to be raised in Great Britain for the Service of the Year One thousand seven hundred and ninety-three. (Repealed by Statute Law Revision Act 1871 (34 & 35 Vict. c. 116))
Families of Militiamen Act 1793 (repealed)	33 Geo. 3. c. 8	6 March 1793
An Act to provide for the Families of Persons chosen by Lot to serve in the Militia of this Kingdom, and of Substitutes serving therein; and to explain and amend an Act of Parliament passed in the Twenty-sixth Year of His present Majesty, intituled, "An Act for amending and reducing into one Act of Parliament the Laws relating to the Militia in that Part of Great Britain called England." (Note: Militia Act 1786 (26 Geo. 3. c. 107)) (Repealed by Relief of Families of Militiamen Act 1803 (43 Geo. 3. c. 47))
Mutiny Act 1793 (repealed)	33 Geo. 3. c. 9	6 March 1793
An Act for punishing Mutiny and Desertion, and for the better Payment of the Army and their Quarters. (Repealed by Statute Law Revision Act 1871 (34 & 35 Vict. c. 116))
Trade with America Act 1793 (repealed)	33 Geo. 3. c. 10	28 March 1793
An Act to continue the Laws now in Force for regulating the Trade between the Subjects of His Majesty's Dominions and the Inhabitants of the Territories belonging to the United States of America, so far as the same relate to the Trade and Commerce carried on between this Kingdom and the Inhabitants of the Countries belonging to the said United States. (Repealed by Statute Law Revision Act 1871 (34 & 35 Vict. c. 116))
Malt Duties Act 1793 (repealed)	33 Geo. 3. c. 11	28 February 1793
An Act for continuing and granting to His Majesty certain Duties upon Malt, Mum, Cyder, and Perry, for the Service of the Year One thousand seven hundred and ninety-three. (Repealed by Statute Law Revision Act 1871 (34 & 35 Vict. c. 116))
Indemnity Act 1793 (repealed)	33 Geo. 3. c. 12	28 March 1793
An Act to indemnify such Persons as have omitted to qualify themselves for Offices and Employments; and to indemnify Justices of the Peace or others, who have omitted to register or deliver in their Qualifications within the Time limited by Law, and for giving further Time for those Purposes; and to indemnify Members and Officers in Cities, Corporations, and Borough Towns, whose Admissions have been omitted to be stamped according to Law, or having been stamped have been lost or mislaid, and for allowing them Time to provide Admissions duly stamped; to give further Time to such Persons as have omitted to make and file Affidavits of the Execution of Indentures of Clerks to Attornies and Solicitors; and for indemnifying Deputy Lieutenants and Officers of the Militia, who have neglected to transmit Descriptions of their Qualifications to the Clerks of the Peace within the Time limited by Law, and for giving further Time for that Purpose. (Repealed by Promissory Oaths Act 1871 (34 & 35 Vict. c. 48))
Acts of Parliament (Commencement) Act 1793	33 Geo. 3. c. 13	28 March 1793
An Act to prevent Acts of Parliament from taking effect from a Time prior to the passing thereof.
Royal Exchange Assurance Act 1793 (repealed)	33 Geo. 3. c. 14	28 March 1793
An act to enable the Royal Exchange Assurance Companies, and their successors, to grant, purchase, and sell annuities upon or for lives. (Repealed by Royal Exchange Assurance Act 1901 (1 Edw. 7. c. x))
Bank of England Site Act 1793 (repealed)	33 Geo. 3. c. 15	28 March 1793
An Act to enable the Governor and Company of the Bank of England to purchase certain Houses and Ground contiguous to the Bank of England. (Repealed by Statute Law (Repeals) Act 1995 (c. 44))
Basingstoke Canal Act 1793	33 Geo. 3. c. 16	28 March 1793
An Act for effectually carrying into Execution an Act of Parliament of the Eighteenth Year of the Reign of His present Majesty, (Note: Basingstoke Canal Act 1778 (18 Geo. 3. c. 75)) for making a Navigable Canal from the Town of Basingstoke, in the County of Southampton, to communicate with the River Wey, in the Parish of Chertsey, in the County of Surrey, and to the South East Side of the Turnpike Road in the Parish of Turgiss, in the said County of Southampton.
Loans or Exchequer Bill Act 1793 (repealed)	33 Geo. 3. c. 17	30 April 1793
An Act for raising a certain Sum of Money, by Loans or Exchequer Bills, for the Service of the Year One thousand seven hundred and ninety-three. (Repealed by Statute Law Revision Act 1871 (34 & 35 Vict. c. 116))
Loans or Exchequer Bill (No. 2) Act 1793 (repealed)	33 Geo. 3. c. 18	30 April 1793
An Act for raising a further Sum of Money, by Loans or Exchequer Bills, for the Service of the Year One thousand seven hundred and ninety-three. (Repealed by Statute Law Revision Act 1871 (34 & 35 Vict. c. 116))
Militia Pay Act 1793 (repealed)	33 Geo. 3. c. 19	30 April 1793
An Act for defraying the Charge of the Pay and Cloathing of the Militia, in that Part of Great Britain called England, for one Year, beginning the Twenty-fifth Day of March One thousand seven hundred and ninety-three; and for making Provision for Adjutants who have served a certain Time in the Militia. (Repealed by Statute Law Revision Act 1871 (34 & 35 Vict. c. 116))
Ipswich and Stowmarket Navigation Act 1793 (repealed)	33 Geo. 3. c. 20	28 March 1793
An Act for effectually carrying into Execution an Act of Parliament of the Thirtieth Year of His present Majesty, (Note: Ipswich and Stowmarket Navigation Act 1790 (30 Geo. 3. c. 57)) for making and maintaining a Navigable Communication between Stowmarket and Ipswich, in the County of Suffolk. (Repealed by Land Drainage Act 1930 (20 & 21 Geo. 5. c. 44) and Ipswich and Stowmarket Navigation Acts Revocation Order 1934 (SR&O 1934/282))
Manchester and Stockport Canal Act 1793	33 Geo. 3. c. 21	28 March 1793
An Act to enable the Company of Proprietors of the Canal Navigation from Manchester to or near Ashton-under-Lyne and Oldham, to extend the said Canal from a Place called Clayton Demesne, in the Township of Droylsden, in the Parish of Manchester aforesaid, to a Place in the Turnpike Road in Heaton Norris, leading between Manchester and Stockport, opposite to the House known by the Sign of the Three Boars Heads, and from or nearly from a Place called Taylor's Barn, in the Township of Reddish, to Denton at a Place called Beat Bank, adjoining the Turnpike Road leading between Stockport and Ashton-under-Lyne, and also from the intended Aqueduct Bridge at or near a Place called Waterhouses, in the Parish of Ashton-under-Lyne aforesaid, to a Place called Stake Leach at Hollinwood, in the Township of Oldham aforesaid.
Reduction of National Debt Act 1793 (repealed)	33 Geo. 3. c. 22	30 April 1793
An Act for granting to His Majesty the Sum of Two hundred thousand Pounds, to be issued and paid to the Governor and Company of the Bank of England, to be by them placed to the Account of the Commissioners for the Reduction of the National Debt. (Repealed by Statute Law Revision Act 1861 (24 & 25 Vict. c. 101))
Table Beer Act 1793 (repealed)	33 Geo. 3. c. 23	30 April 1793
An Act for altering the Provisions of an Act passed in the Twenty-second Year of the Reign of His present Majesty, (Note: Taxation Act 1782 (22 Geo. 3. c. 68)) for repealing the Duties payable for Beer and Ale above Six Shillings the Barrel, exclusive of the Duties of Excise, and not exceeding Eleven Shillings the Barrel, exclusive of such Duties; and for other Purposes therein mentioned, so far as respects the Quality of Table Beer brewed by Common Brewers. (Repealed by Statute Law Revision Act 1861 (24 & 25 Vict. c. 101))
Chorley and Rufford Chapels, Lancaster Act 1793	33 Geo. 3. c. 24	28 March 1793
An Act for separating the Chapels of Chorley and Rufford from the Parish of Croston, in the County of Lancaster, and for making them two distinct Parish Churches.
Ludlow, Salop Improvement Act 1793 (repealed)	33 Geo. 3. c. 25	28 March 1793
An Act for paving the Foot Paths within the Borough of Ludlow, in the County of Salop; and for lighting, watching, and otherwise improving the said Borough. (Repealed by Local Government Supplemental Act 1860 (23 & 24 Vict. c. 44))
Supply of Seamen Act 1793 (repealed)	33 Geo. 3. c. 26	30 April 1793
An Act for the better Supply of Mariners and Seamen, to serve in His Majesty's Ships of War, and on Board Merchant Ships, and other trading Ships and Vessels, during the present War. (Repealed by Statute Law Revision Act 1871 (34 & 35 Vict. c. 116))
Correspondence with Enemies Act 1793 (repealed)	33 Geo. 3. c. 27	7 May 1793
An Act more effectually to prevent, during the present War between Great Britain and France, all Traitorous Correspondence with or Aid or Assistance being given to His Majesty's Enemies. (Repealed by Statute Law Revision Act 1871 (34 & 35 Vict. c. 116))
National Debt Act 1793 (repealed)	33 Geo. 3. c. 28	30 April 1793
An Act for raising a certain Sum of Money by Way of Annuities, to be charged on the Consolidated Fund; and for making perpetual certain Duties of Excise on British Spirits, and certain Duties on the Amount of assessed Taxes. (Repealed by Statute Law Revision Act 1870 (33 & 34 Vict. c. 69))
Exchequer Bills Act 1793 (repealed)	33 Geo. 3. c. 29	8 May 1793
An Act for enabling His Majesty to direct the Issue of Exchequer Bills, to a limited Amount, for the Purposes, and in the Manner therein mentioned. (Repealed by Statute Law Revision Act 1861 (24 & 25 Vict. c. 101))
Forgeries and Frauds in Bank Transfers Act 1793 (repealed)	33 Geo. 3. c. 30	30 April 1793
An Act for the better preventing Forgeries and Frauds in the Transfers of the several Funds, transferrable at the Bank of England. (Repealed by Statute Law Revision Act 1861 (24 & 25 Vict. c. 101))
Liverpool Note Issue Act 1793 (repealed)	33 Geo. 3. c. 31	10 May 1793
An Act to enable the Common Council of the Town of Liverpool in the County of Lancaster, on Behalf and Account of the Corporation of the said Town, to issue Negotiable Notes, for a limited Time, and to a limited Amount. (Repealed by Statute Law Revision Act 1948 (11 & 12 Geo. 6. c. 62))
National Debt (No. 2) Act 1793 (repealed)	33 Geo. 3. c. 32	7 May 1793
An Act for enabling His Majesty to raise the Sum of One million five hundred thousand Pounds for the Uses and Purposes therein mentioned; and for providing that the Governor and Company of the Bank of England shall not be subject to any Penalties by reason of an Act, made in the Fifth Year of the Reign of King William and Queen Mary, (Note: Orphans, London Act 1694 (5 & 6 Will. & Mar. c. 10)) on Account of their advancing Money for the Payment of Bills of Exchange accepted by, or by the Direction of the Commissioners of His Majesty's Treasury, and made payable at the Bank of England. (Repealed by Statute Law Revision Act 1870 (33 & 34 Vict. c. 69))
Salt Act 1793 (repealed)	33 Geo. 3. c. 33	30 April 1793
An Act for repealing part of an Act passed in the First Year of the Reign of Queen Anne, intituled, "An Act for preventing Frauds in the Duties upon Salt, and for the better Payment of Debentures at the Custom House," (Note: Salt Duties, etc. Act 1702 (1 Ann. c. 15)) which may relate to the refining and making of Salt at certain Works intended to be erected at Garston, in the County Palatine of Lancaster, instead of the present Salt Works at Liverpool. (Repealed by Statute Law Revision Act 1861 (24 & 25 Vict. c. 101))
Prize Act 1793 (repealed)	33 Geo. 3. c. 34	10 May 1793
An Act for the Relief of the Captors of Prizes with respect to the bringing and landing certain Prize Goods in this Kingdom. (Repealed by Statute Law Revision Act 1871 (34 & 35 Vict. c. 116))
Poor Act 1793 (repealed)	33 Geo. 3. c. 35	7 May 1793
An Act to explain and amend an Act, passed in the Twenty-second Year of the Reign of His present Majesty, (Note: Relief of the Poor Act 1782 (22 Geo. 3. c. 83)) for the better Relief and Employment of the Poor. (Repealed by Statute Law Revision Act 1871 (34 & 35 Vict. c. 116))
Fencibles Act 1793 (repealed)	33 Geo. 3. c. 36	7 May 1793
An Act to establish certain regulations respecting officers serving in several corps of Fencible Men, in that part of Great Britain called Scotland, and in certain other corps which may be directed to be raised in Great Britain. (Repealed by Statute Law Revision Act 1871 (34 & 35 Vict. c. 116))
Bread Act 1793 (repealed)	33 Geo. 3. c. 37	10 May 1793
An Act to amend an Act made in the Thirty-first Year of the Reign of His late Majesty King George the Second, intituled, "An Act for the due making of Bread, and to regulate the Price and Assize thereof; and to punish Persons who shall adulterate Meal, Flour or Bread;" (Note: Making of Bread Act 1757 (31 Geo. 2. c. 29)) with respect to the Time within which certain Prosecutions directed by the said Act, are to be brought. (Repealed by Statute Law Revision Act 1871 (34 & 35 Vict. c. 116))
Warwick and Birmingham Canal Act 1793	33 Geo. 3. c. 38	6 March 1793
An Act for making and maintaining a Navigable Canal from or nearly from a Place called The Saltisford, in the Parish of Saint Mary, in the Borough of Warwick, into or near to the Parish of Birmingham, in the County of Warwick, and to terminate at or near to a certain Navigable Canal in or near to the Town of Birmingham, called The Digbeth Branch of the Birmingham and Fazeley Canal Navigations.
Hemlingford Riots Act 1793 (repealed)	33 Geo. 3. c. 39	3 June 1793
An Act for the more easy raising Money upon the Hundred of Hemlingford, in the County of Warwick, for paying the Damages and Costs incurred on account of the late Riots within the said Hundred, than is authorized to be done by the Laws now in being. (Repealed by Statute Law Revision Act 1948 (11 & 12 Geo. 6. c. 62))
Continuance of Laws Act 1793 (repealed)	33 Geo. 3. c. 40	3 June 1793
An Act to continue several Laws relating to the landing Rum or Spirits of the British Sugar Plantations before Payment of the Duties of Excise; to the giving further Encouragement to the Importation of Naval Stores from the British Colonies in America; to the granting Liberty to carry Sugars of the Growth, Produce, or Manufacture of any of His Majesty's Sugar Colonies directly to foreign Parts, in Ships built in Great Britain and navigated according to Law; to the permitting the Exportation of Tobacco Pipe Clay, from this Kingdom to the British Sugar Colonies or Plantations in the West Indies; to the granting a Bounty on certain Species of British and Irish Linens exported, and taking off the Duties on the Importation of Foreign Raw Linen Yarns made of Flax; to the prohibiting the Exportation of Tools and Utensils made Use of in the Iron and Steel Manufactures of this Kingdom, and to prevent the seducing of Artificers and Workmen employed in those Manufactures, to go into Parts beyond the Seas; to the ascertaining the Strength of Spirits by Clarke's Hydrometer; and to revive and continue an Act made in the Twenty-third Year of His present Majesty's Reign, (Note: Flax, etc., Manufacture Act 1783 (23 Geo. 3. c. 77)) for the more effectual Encouragement of the Manufactures of Flax and Cotton in Great Britain. (Repealed by Statute Law Revision Act 1871 (34 & 35 Vict. c. 116))
Restoration of Robert Claxton Act 1793 (repealed)	33 Geo. 3. c. 41	7 May 1793
An Act to enable Robert Claxton of Bristol, (Note: Robert Claxton was Mayor of Bristol in 1798.) Merchant, to take the Oath prescribed and directed to be taken by an Act of the Twenty-sixth Year of His present Majesty, (Note: Shipping Act 1786 (26 Geo. 3. c. 60)) for the further Encrease and Encouragement of Shipping and Navigation. (Repealed by Statute Law Revision Act 1948 (11 & 12 Geo. 6. c. 62))
Free Fishers of Whitstable Act 1793	33 Geo. 3. c. 42	30 April 1793
An Act for incorporating the Company of Free Fishers and Dredgers of Whitstable, in the County of Kent, and for the better ordering and Government of the Fishery.
Paddington Parish Church Act 1793	33 Geo. 3. c. 43	30 April 1793
An Act for enlarging the Powers of and rendering more effectual an Act made in the Twenty-eighth Year of the Reign of His present Majesty, intituled, "An Act for re-building the Parish Church of Paddington, in the County of Middlesex, and for enlarging the Church Yard of the said Parish." (Note: Paddington Parish Church Act 1788 (28 Geo. 3. c. 74))
Roman Catholics Act 1793 (repealed)	33 Geo. 3. c. 44	3 June 1793
An Act for requiring a certain Form of Oath of Abjuration and Declaration, from His Majesty's Subjects professing the Roman Catholick religion, in that Part of Great Britain called Scotland. (Repealed by Religious Disabilities Act 1846 (9 & 10 Vict. c. 59))
Hanbury Church Act 1793	33 Geo. 3. c. 45	30 April 1793
An Act for taking down and re-building the Tower of the Parish Church of Hanbury, in the County of Worcester, and for repairing the said Church, and rendering the same more commodious for the Parishioners.
Crown Lands, Forfeited Estates in Ireland Act 1793 (repealed)	33 Geo. 3. c. 46	7 June 1793
An Act for vesting in His Majesty certain forfeited Estates in Ireland, subject to the Disposition of the Parliament of Ireland. (Repealed by Statute Law (Repeals) Act 1978 (c. 45))
East India Company (Money) Act 1793 or the East India Company (Stock) Act 1793 (repealed)	33 Geo. 3. c. 47	7 June 1793
An Act for placing the Stock called East India Annuities, under the Management of the Governor and Company of the Bank of England, and ingrafting the same on the Three Pounds per Centum Reduced Annuities, in Redemption of a Debt of Four millions two hundred thousand Pounds owing by the Publick to the East India Company, and for enabling the said Company to raise a Sum of Money by a further Increase of their Capital Stock, to be applied in discharge of certain Debts of the said Company. (Repealed by East India Loans Act 1937 (1 Edw. 8 & 1 Geo. 6. c. 14))
Customs Act 1793 (repealed)	33 Geo. 3. c. 48	3 June 1793
An Act to allow the Drawback of the Duties of Customs and Excise upon Wines consumed by Admirals, Captains, and other commissioned Officers on board Ships of War in actual Service, and to allow such Ships to be supplied with Tobacco Duty free. (Repealed by Customs Law Repeal Act 1825 (6 Geo. 4. c. 105))
British Sailcloth, etc. Act 1793 (repealed)	33 Geo. 3. c. 49	3 June 1793
An Act for further continuing and amending an Act made in the Ninth Year of the Reign of His late Majesty King George the Second, intituled, "An Act for further encouraging and regulating the Manufacture of British Sail Cloth; and for the more effectual securing the Duties now payable on foreign Sail Cloth imported into this Kingdom." (Note: Manufacture of Sail Cloth Act 1735 (9 Geo. 2. c. 37)) (Repealed by Statute Law Revision Act 1871 (34 & 35 Vict. c. 116))
Importation and Exportation Act 1793 (repealed)	33 Geo. 3. c. 50	3 June 1793
An Act to amend an Act passed in the Twenty-seventh Year of His present Majesty's Reign, (Note: Importation and Exportation Act 1787 (27 Geo. 3. c. 27)) for allowing the Importation and Exportation of certain Goods, Wares, and Merchandize, in Foreign Ships, into and from certain Ports and Places in the West Indies; and for amending so much of an Act made in the Thirty-second Year of the Reign of His present Majesty, (Note: Customs (No. 2) Act 1792 (32 Geo. 3. c. 43)) as relates to permitting the Importation of Sugar into the Bahama and Bermuda Islands in Foreign Ships; and so much of two Acts made in the Twenty-eighth (Note: Trade Act 1788 (28 Geo. 3. c. 6)) and Thirty-first (Note: Importation (No. 2) Act 1791 (31 Geo. 3. c. 38)) Years of His present Majesty's Reign, as prohibits the Importation of Timber into any Island under the Dominion of His Majesty in the West Indies, from any Foreign Colony or Plantation in the West Indies or South America; and so much of the said Act, made in the Twenty-eighth Year of His present Majesty's Reign, as prohibits the Importation of Pitch, Tar, and Turpentine into Nova Scotia or New Brunswick, from any Country belonging to the United States of America. (Repealed by Trade Act 1822 (3 Geo. 4. c. 44))
Amendment of c. 29 of this Session Act 1793 (repealed)	33 Geo. 3. c. 51	17 June 1793
An Act for rendering more effectual an Act of the present Session of Parliament, intituled, "An Act for enabling His Majesty to direct the Issue of Exchequer Bills to a limited Amount, for the Purposes and in the Manner therein mentioned." (Note: Exchequer Bills Act 1793 (33 Geo. 3. c. 29)) (Repealed by Statute Law Revision Act 1871 (34 & 35 Vict. c. 116))
East India Company Act 1793 or the Charter Act 1793 (repealed)	33 Geo. 3. c. 52	11 June 1793
An Act for continuing in the East India Company for a further Term the Possession of the British Territories in India, together with their exclusive Trade under certain Limitations; for establishing further Regulations for the Government of the said Territories, and the better Administration of Justice within the same; for appropriating to certain Uses the Revenues and Profits of the said Company, and for making Provision for the good Order and Government of the Towns of Calcutta, Madras, and Bombay. (Repealed by Government of India Act 1915 (5 & 6 Geo. 5. c. 61))
Pawnbrokers Act 1793	33 Geo. 3. c. 53	3 June 1793
An Act to continue and amend an Act passed in the Twenty-ninth Year of the Reign of His present Majesty, intituled, "An Act for further regulating the Trade or Business of Pawnbrokers." (Note: Pawnbrokers Act 1789 (29 Geo. 3. c. 57))
Friendly Societies Act 1793 or Roses's Act (repealed)	33 Geo. 3. c. 54	21 June 1793
An Act for the Encouragement and Relief of Friendly Societies. (Repealed by Friendly Societies Act 1855 (18 & 19 Vict. c. 63))
Parish Officers Act 1793 (repealed)	33 Geo. 3. c. 55	21 June 1793
An Act to authorize Justices of the Peace to impose Fines upon Constables, Overseers, and other Peace or Parish Officers, for Neglect of Duty, and on Masters of Apprentices for ill Usage of such their Apprentices; and also to make Provision for the Execution of Warrants of Distress granted by Magistrates. (Repealed by Statute Law Revision Act 1966 (c. 5))
Sugar Act 1793 (repealed)	33 Geo. 3. c. 56	17 June 1793
An Act to amend an Act made in the last Session of Parliament, intituled, "An Act for regulating the Allowance of the Drawback and Payment of the Bounty on the Exportation of Sugar; and for permitting the Importation of Sugar and Coffee into the Bahama and Bermuda Islands, in foreign Ships;" and for reducing the Bounty on refined Sugars, exported in any other than British Ships. (Repealed by Customs Law Repeal Act 1825 (6 Geo. 4. c. 105))
Warehoused Tobacco, etc. Act 1793 (repealed)	33 Geo. 3. c. 57	17 June 1793
An Act for the better Regulation of Warehoused Tobacco, and for permitting certain Tobacco of the Spanish Dominions to be admitted to Entry on the Payment of the British Plantation Duty. (Repealed by Statute Law Revision Act 1861 (24 & 25 Vict. c. 101))
Southern Whale Fishery Act 1793 (repealed)	33 Geo. 3. c. 58	17 June 1793
An Act to allow to Ships carrying on the Southern Whale Fishery to the North of the Equator, the same Premium as they are now entitled to if they do not pass the Equator. (Repealed by Statute Law Revision Act 1861 (24 & 25 Vict. c. 101))
Excise Act 1793 (repealed)	33 Geo. 3. c. 59	17 June 1793
An Act to continue certain Duties of Excise on foreign Spirits imported into this Kingdom, for a limited Time; and also for continuing certain Laws of Excise therein mentioned. (Repealed by Statute Law Revision Act 1871 (34 & 35 Vict. c. 116))
Mail to Spain Act 1793 (repealed)	33 Geo. 3. c. 60	17 June 1793
An Act to enable the Post-master General to send the Mail to the Dominions of His Catholic Majesty, on board of any Vessels authorized by His Catholic Majesty to carry the same. (Repealed by Post Office (Repeal of Laws) Act 1837 (7 Will. 4. & 1 Vict. c. 32))
Distilleries, etc. (Scotland) Act 1793 (repealed)	33 Geo. 3. c. 61	17 June 1793
An Act for the Regulation of Distillers in Scotland, and the Exportation of British made Spirits from England to Scotland, and from Scotland to England, for a limited Time. (Repealed by Statute Law Revision Act 1871 (34 & 35 Vict. c. 116))
Lottery Act 1793 (repealed)	33 Geo. 3. c. 62	17 June 1793
An Act for granting to His Majesty a certain Sum of Money to be raised by a Lottery. (Repealed by Statute Law Revision Act 1871 (34 & 35 Vict. c. 116))
Importation Act 1793 (repealed)	33 Geo. 3. c. 63	17 June 1793
An Act to permit Goods and Commodities of the Growth, Production, or Manufacture of Asia, Africa, or America, legally imported into Ireland, to be imported from thence into Great Britain. (Repealed by Statute Law Revision Act 1861 (24 & 25 Vict. c. 101))
Parliamentary Elections Act 1793 (repealed)	33 Geo. 3. c. 64	17 June 1793
An Act to explain and amend an Act passed in the Seventh and Eighth Years of King William the Third, intituled, "An Act for the further regulating Elections of Members to serve in Parliament; and for the preventing irregular Proceedings of Sheriffs and other Officers in the electing and returning such Members," (Note: Parliamentary Elections Act 1695 (7 & 8 Will. 3. c. 25)) so far as relates to the Publication of Notices of the Time and Place of Election. (Repealed by Ballot Act 1872 (35 & 36 Vict. c. 33) and Representation of the People Act 1918 (7 & 8 Geo. 5. c. 64))
Importation and Exportation (No. 2) Act 1793 (repealed)	33 Geo. 3. c. 65	17 June 1793
An Act to amend an Act made in the Thirty-first Year of the Reign of His present Majesty, intituled, "An Act for regulating the Importation and Exportation of Corn, and the Payment of the Duty on Foreign Corn imported, and of the Bounty on British Corn exported." (Note: Importation and Exportation (No. 2) Act 1791 (31 Geo. 3. c. 30)) (Repealed by Importation and Exportation Act 1821 (1 & 2 Geo. 4. c. 87))
Manning of the Navy, etc. Act 1793 (repealed)	33 Geo. 3. c. 66	17 June 1793
An Act for the Encouragement of Seamen, and for the better and more effectually manning His Majesty's Navy. (Repealed by Naval Prize Acts Repeal Act 1864 (27 & 28 Vict. c. 23))
Shipping Offences Act 1793 (repealed)	33 Geo. 3. c. 67	17 June 1793
An Act for better preventing Offences in obstructing, destroying, or damaging Ships or other Vessels, and in obstructing Seamen, Keelmen, Casters, and Ship Carpenters, from pursuing their lawful Occupations. (Repealed by Public Order Act 1986 (c. 64))
Wales, Chester, etc. (Courts) Act 1793 (repealed)	33 Geo. 3. c. 68	17 June 1793
An Act for remedying Inconveniences attending certain Proceedings in the Courts of Great Sessions in Wales, and for the County Palatine of Chester, in the Court of Common Pleas for the County Palatine of Lancaster, in the Court of Pleas for the County Palatine of Durham, and in the County Courts in Wales. (Repealed by Statute Law Revision Act 1887 (50 & 51 Vict. c. 59))
Excise (Scotland) Act 1793 (repealed)	33 Geo. 3. c. 69	17 June 1793
An Act for repealing the Duties on Coals, Culm, and Cinders brought or carried Coastwise into Scotland, and for granting other Duties on Licences to sell certain distilled Spirituous Liquors in lieu thereof. (Repealed by Statute Law Revision Act 1871 (34 & 35 Vict. c. 116))
Customs (No. 2) Act 1793 (repealed)	33 Geo. 3. c. 70	17 June 1793
An Act for repealing the Duties and Drawbacks on Figs, and for granting and allowing other Duties and Drawbacks in lieu thereof; for charging a Duty on the Importation, and allowing a Drawback on the Exportation of Virginal Wire of Copper; for empowering the Commissioners of the Customs to authorize their Officers to make Allowance for Damages received by Goods during the Voyage; and for authorizing the Commissioners of the Customs and Excise to sell Vessels, liable to be broken up, to private Persons, to be used as Privateers. (Repealed by Customs Law Repeal Act 1825 (6 Geo. 4. c. 105))
Post Horse Duties Act 1793 (repealed)	33 Geo. 3. c. 71	17 June 1793
An Act for further continuing, for a limited Time, an Act made in the Twenty-seventh Year of the Reign of His present Majesty, (Note: Post Horse Duties Act 1787 (27 Geo. 3. c. 26)) intituled, "An Act to enable the Lord High Treasurer or Commissioners of the Treasury for the Time being, to let to Farm the Duties granted by an Act made in the Twenty-fifth Year of His present Majesty's Reign, (Note: Duties on Post Horses, etc. Act 1785 (25 Geo. 3. c. 51)) on Horses let to Hire for travelling Post, and by Time, to such Persons as should be willing to contract for the same." (Repealed by Statute Law Revision Act 1871 (34 & 35 Vict. c. 116))
Appropriation Act 1793 (repealed)	33 Geo. 3. c. 72	21 June 1793
An Act for granting to His Majesty a certain Sum of Money out of the Consolidated Fund; for applying a certain Sum of Money therein mentioned for the Service of the Year One thousand seven hundred and ninety-three; and for further appropriating the Supplies granted in this Session of Parliament. (Repealed by Statute Law Revision Act 1871 (34 & 35 Vict. c. 116))
Slave Trade Act 1793 (repealed)	33 Geo. 3. c. 73	17 June 1793
An Act to continue for a limited Time, and to amend several Acts of Parliament for regulating the Shipping, and carrying Slaves in British Vessels from the Coast of Africa. (Repealed by Statute Law Revision Act 1871 (34 & 35 Vict. c. 116))
Payment of Creditors (Scotland) Act 1793 (repealed)	33 Geo. 3. c. 74	17 June 1793
An Act for rendering the Payment of Creditors more equal and expeditious in that Part of Great Britain called Scotland. (Repealed by Statute Law Revision Act 1871 (34 & 35 Vict. c. 116))
London (Streets and Sewers) Act 1793 (repealed)	33 Geo. 3. c. 75	3 June 1793
An Act to explain, amend, and render more effectual an Act passed in the Eleventh Year of His present Majesty's Reign, intituled, "An Act for consolidating, extending, and rendering more effectual the Powers granted by several Acts of Parliament, for making, enlarging, amending, and cleansing the Vaults, Drains, and Sewers, within the City of London and Liberties thereof, and for paving, cleansing, and lighting the Streets, Lanes, Squares, Yards, Courts, Alleys, Passages, and Places, and preventing and removing Obstructions and Annoyances within the same." (Note: City of London Sewerage Act 1771 (11 Geo. 3. c. 29)) (Repealed by City of London Sewers Act 1848 (11 & 12 Vict. c. clxiii) and City of London Sewers Act 1851 (14 & 15 Vict. c. xci))
Courts (Newfoundland) Act 1793 (repealed)	33 Geo. 3. c. 76	17 June 1793
An Act for establishing Courts of Judicature in the Island of Newfoundland, and the Islands adjacent. (Repealed by Newfoundland Act 1809 (49 Geo. 3. c. 27))
Annuity (Lord Rodney) Act 1793 (repealed)	33 Geo. 3. c. 77	17 June 1793
An Act for further settling and securing a certain Annuity on the Heirs Male of the Body of the late Lord Rodney, to whom the Barony of Rodney shall descend, in Consideration of the eminent Services performed by the said late Lord Rodney to His Majesty and the Public. (Repealed by Statute Law Revision Act 1871 (34 & 35 Vict. c. 116) and Statute Law Revision Act 1948 (11 & 12 Geo. 6. c. 62))
Cornwall Duchy Act 1793 (repealed)	33 Geo. 3. c. 78	17 June 1793
An Act to enable His Royal Highness George Prince of Wales to make Leases, Copies, and Grants of Offices, Lands and Hereditaments, Parcel of His said Royal Highness's Duchy of Cornwall, or annexed to the same; and for the other Purposes therein mentioned. (Repealed by Statute Law Revision Act 1948 (11 & 12 Geo. 6. c. 62))
Militia, Sussex Act 1793 (repealed)	33 Geo. 3. c. 79	11 June 1793
An Act requiring and authorizing Charles Gilbert Esquire, Treasurer of the Eastern Division, and the Reverend Francis Tutté, the legal Representative of Randolph Tutté, deceased, late Treasurer of the Western Division of the County of Sussex, to pay certain Sums of Money received by them the said Treasurers, or either of them, on account of the not raising the Militia of the said County, into the public Stocks of the said Divisions, to be applied as therein is directed; and for other Purposes therein mentioned. (Repealed by Statute Law Revision Act 1948 (11 & 12 Geo. 6. c. 62))
Grand Junction Canal Act 1793	33 Geo. 3. c. 80	30 April 1793
An Act for making and maintaining a Navigable Canal from the Oxford Canal Navigation at Braunston, in the County of Northampton, to join the River Thames at or near Brentford, in the County of Middlesex; and also certain Collateral Cuts from the said intended Canal.
Customs (No. 3) Act 1793 (repealed)	33 Geo. 3. c. 81	17 June 1793
An Act to amend an Act made in the Twenty-sixth Year of the Reign of His present Majesty, intituled, "An Act for allowing a Drawback of the Duties upon Coals used in smelting Copper and Lead Ores, and in Fire Engines for draining Water out of the Copper and Lead Mines within the Isle of Anglesey." (Note: Customs (No. 2) Act 1786 (26 Geo. 3. c. 104)) (Repealed by Customs Law Repeal Act 1825 (6 Geo. 4. c. 105))
Whitechapel, Stepney Improvement Act 1793 (repealed)	33 Geo. 3. c. 82	17 June 1793
An Act to explain and amend an Act passed in the Eleventh Year of the Reign of His present Majesty, (Note: London (Streets) Act 1771 (11 Geo. 3. c. 54)) for the better paving, cleansing, lighting, and watching Haydon Square, (Note: The former Haydon Square, between the Minories and Mansell Street. Now built over. 51°30′44″N 0°04′27″W) the New Square, (Note: New Square is now incorporated into Vine Street. 51°30′43″N 0°04′34″W) Haydon Yard, (Note: The remaining part of Haydon Yard is now Haydon Street. 51°30′43″N 0°04′29″W) Sheepy Yard, (Note: The former Sheppy Yard, off the Minories. Now built over. 51°30′44″N 0°04′30″W) Church Street, (Note: Church Street, off the Minories, now renamed to St. Claire Street. 51°30′45″N 0°04′31″W) Little Church Street, otherwise the Church Passage, Church Court, and Kenton Street, and the Passages therein or leading thereto, in the Parish of Trinity, otherwise Holy Trinity, in the Minories, in the County of Middlesex, within the Liberty of His Majesty's Tower of London, and for other Purposes therein mentioned. (Repealed by London Government (Borough of Stepney) Order in Council 1901 (SR&O 1901/276))
Saint Luke, Old Street Improvement Act 1793 (repealed)	33 Geo. 3. c. 83	3 June 1793
An Act for the better lighting, cleansing, watching, and regulating the Squares, Streets, Lanes, Alleys, Passages, and Places within the Parish of Saint Luke, in the County of Middlesex; and for removing and preventing Nuisances, Annoyances, and Encroachments within the same. (Repealed by St Luke's Parish, Middlesex, Improvement Act 1810 (50 Geo. 3. c. cxlix))
West Riding Small Debts Act 1793 (repealed)	33 Geo. 3. c. 84	30 April 1793
An Act to repeal so much of an Act made in the Twentieth Year of His present Majesty's Reign, (Note: West Riding (Small Debts) Act 1780 (20 Geo. 3. c. 65)) as relates to the more easy and speedy Recovery of Small Debts within the Parishes of Halifax, Bradford, Kighley, Bingley, Guiseley, Calverley, Batley, Birstal, Mirfield, Hartishead-cum-Clifton, Almondbury, Kirkheaton, Kirkburton, and Huddersfield, and the Lordship or Liberty of Tong, in the West Riding of the County of York, and for granting other Powers for those Purposes. (Repealed by County Courts Act 1846 (9 & 10 Vict. c. 95))
Plymouth Water Supply Act 1793 (repealed)	33 Geo. 3. c. 85	28 March 1793
An Act for supplying the Towns of Plymouth Dock, Stoke Damarel, Stonehouse, and the Parts adjacent, in the County of Devon, with Water. (Repealed by Devonport Corporation (Water) Act 1902 (2 Edw. 7. c. ccxxv))
Leeds Coal Supply Act 1793 (repealed)	33 Geo. 3. c. 86	30 April 1793
An Act for amending and enlarging the Powers of Two Acts, one made in the Thirty-first Year of the Reign of His late Majesty King George the Second, (Note: Middleton Railway Act 1757 (31 Geo. 2. c. 22 Pr.)) and the other made in the Nineteenth Year of the Reign of His present Majesty, (Note: Leeds Coal Supply Act 1779 (19 Geo. 3. c. 11)) for the better supplying the Town and Neighbourhood of Leeds, in the County of York, with Coals. (Repealed by Statute Law (Repeals) Act 1978 (c. 45))
Saint Mary, Islington, Church Act 1793	33 Geo. 3. c. 87	30 April 1793
An Act for enlarging the Church Yard or Cemetery of the Parish Church of Saint Mary Islington, in the County of Middlesex.
Bethnal Green and Shoreditch Improvement Act 1793 (repealed)	33 Geo. 3. c. 88	30 April 1793
An Act for paving and repairing certain Streets, Lanes, and other Public Passages and Places, in the Parish of Saint Matthew Bethnal Green, in the County of Middlesex; and for paving and regulating such Parts of Old Cock Lane and York Street, as are in the Parish of Saint Leonard, Shoreditch; and for removing Obstructions and Annoyances therein. (Repealed by Bethnal Green Road Act 1805 (45 Geo. 3. c. vi) and London Government (Borough of Bethnal Green) Order in Council 1901 (SR&O 1901/212))
Walcot, Somerset Improvement Act 1793 (repealed)	33 Geo. 3. c. 89	17 June 1793
An Act for paving, cleansing, lighting, watching, and regulating the Streets, Squares, Lanes, Ways, Passages, and public Places, within such Part of the Parish of Walcot, in the County of Somerset, as is not within the Circuit, Precinct, and Jurisdiction of the City of Bath, in the same County; and for removing and preventing Nuisances, Annoyances, Encroachments, and Obstructions; and for establishing a proper and effectual Police therein; and for licensing and regulating Hackney Coaches, Chairs, Porters, Basket Men, and Basket Women, within the said City of Bath, and a certain Distance thereof. (Repealed by City of Bath Act 1851 (14 & 15 Vict. c. civ))
Christchurch, Surrey, Streets Act 1793	33 Geo. 3. c. 90	21 June 1793
An Act for making a new Street from Saint George's Road, in the Parish of Christ Church, in the County of Surrey, through Holland's Leagure, into and across the Green Walk, and from thence into Gravel Lane, in the said Parish; and for discontinuing as a Publick Highway Part of a Street called the Upper Ground Street, in the said Parish.
Ellesmere and Chester Canal Act 1793 (repealed)	33 Geo. 3. c. 91	30 April 1793
An Act for making and maintaining a Navigable Canal from the River Severn, at Shrewsbury, in the County of Salop, to the River Mersey, at or near Netherpool in the County of Chester, and also for making and maintaining certain Collateral Cuts from the said intended Canal. (Repealed by Ellesmere and Chester Canal Act 1827 (7 & 8 Geo. 4. c. cii))
Ipswich Improvement Act 1793 (repealed)	33 Geo. 3. c. 92	3 June 1793
An Act for paving, lighting, cleansing, and otherwise improving the Town of Ipswich, in the County of Suffolk; and for removing and preventing Encroachments, Obstructions, and Annoyances therein. (Repealed by Ipswich Improvement Act 1837 (7 Will. 4 & 1 Vict. c. lxxiii))
Chelmsford and Blackwater Canal Act 1793	33 Geo. 3. c. 93	17 June 1793
An Act for making and maintaining a Navigable Communication between the Town of Chelmsford or some Part of the Parish of Springfield, in the County of Essex, and a Place called Collier's Reach, in or near the River Blackwater, in the said County.
Grantham Canal Act 1793	33 Geo. 3. c. 94	30 April 1793
An Act for making and maintaining a Navigable Canal from or nearly from the Town of Grantham, in the County of Lincoln, to the River Trent, near Nottingham Trent Bridge, and also a Collateral Cut from the said intended Canal, at or near Cropwell Butler, to the Town of Bingham, both in the County of Nottingham.
Aberdare Canal Act 1793	33 Geo. 3. c. 95	28 March 1793
An Act for making and maintaining a Navigable Canal from the Glamorganshire Canal, to or near the Village of Aberdare, in the County of Glamorgan; and for making and maintaining a rail-way or stone road from thence to or near Abernant, in the parish of Cadoxstone-juxta-Neath, in the said County.
Brecknock and Abergavenny Canal Act 1793	33 Geo. 3. c. 96	28 March 1793
An Act for making and maintaining a Navigable Canal from the Town of Brecknock to the Monmouthshire Canal, near the Town of Pontypool, in the County of Monmouth, and for making and maintaining Railways and Stone Roads from such Canal to the several Iron Works and Mines in the Counties of Brecknock and Monmouth.
Gloucester and Berkeley Canal Act 1793	33 Geo. 3. c. 97	28 March 1793
An Act for making and maintaining a Navigable Canal from the River Severn, at or near the City of Gloucester, into a Place called Berkeley Pill, in the Parish of Berkeley, and also a Cut to or near the Town of Berkeley, in the County of Gloucester.
Leicestershire and Northamptonshire Union Canal Act 1793	33 Geo. 3. c. 98	30 April 1793
An Act for making and maintaining a Navigation from the Town of Leicester to communicate with the River Nen, in or near the Town of Northampton; and also a certain Collateral Cut from the said Navigation.
Foss Navigation Act 1793	33 Geo. 3. c. 99	30 April 1793
An Act for making and maintaining a Navigable Communication from the Junction of the River Foss with the River Ouse, at or near the City of York, to Stillington Mill, in the Parish of Stillington, in the North Riding of the County of York; and for draining and improving certain Low Lands, lying on each Side of the said River Foss.
Littlehampton Harbour Act 1793 (repealed)	33 Geo. 3. c. 100	30 April 1793
An Act to explain and amend an Act made in the Sixth Year of the Reign of His late Majesty King George the Second, intituled, "An Act for erecting Piers in, and for repairing and keeping in Repair the Harbour of Little Hampton, called Arundel Port, in the County of Sussex;" (Note: Littlehampton Harbour Act 1732 (6 Geo. 2. c. 12)) and for empowering the Commissioners acting under the said Act to improve the Navigation of the River Arun, from the said Harbour to the Town of Arundel, in the said County. (Repealed by Arundel Port Act 1825 (6 Geo. 4. c. clxx) and Littlehampton Harbour and Arun Drainage Outfall Act 1927 (17 & 18 Geo. 5. c. lxvii))
All Saints' Church, Southampton Act 1793	33 Geo. 3. c. 101	30 April 1793
An Act for amending and enlarging the Powers of an Act, made in the Thirty-first Year of the Reign of His present Majesty, intituled, "An Act for taking down and re-building the Parish Church of All Saints, within the Town and County of the Town of Southampton; and for purchasing Land for the Purpose of a Church Yard, for the Use of the said Parish." (Note: All Saints Church, Southampton Act 1791 (31 Geo. 3. c. 71))
Derby Canal Act 1793	33 Geo. 3. c. 102	7 May 1793
An Act for making and maintaining a Navigable Canal from the River Trent, at or near Swarkstone Bridge, to and through the Borough of Derby, to Little Eaton, with a Cut out of the said Canal, in or near the said Borough, to join the Erewash Canal near Sandiacre, and for making Railways from such Canal to several Collieries in the Parishes or Liberties of Denby Horsley and Smalley, all in the County of Derby.
Oakham Canal Act 1793	33 Geo. 3. c. 103	7 May 1793
An Act for making and maintaining a Navigable Cut or Canal from the Melton Mowbray Navigation in the County of Leicester, to Oakham in the County of Rutland.
Crinan Canal Act 1793	33 Geo. 3. c. 104	8 May 1793
An Act for making and maintaining a Navigable Canal from Loch Gilp to Loch Crinan, in the Shire of Argyll.
Ulverstone Canal Act 1793	33 Geo. 3. c. 105	8 May 1793
An Act for making and maintaining a Navigable Cut or Canal from a Place called Hammerside Hill in the Parish of Ulverstone, in the County Palatine of Lancaster, to a Place called Weint End near the Town of Ulverstone aforesaid.
Bubwith Bridge Act 1793	33 Geo. 3. c. 106	8 May 1793
An Act for building a Bridge over the River Derwent, at or near Bubwith Ferry, in the East Riding of the County of York, and making proper Approaches thereto.
Lancaster Canal Act 1793	33 Geo. 3. c. 107	10 May 1793
An Act to alter and amend an Act passed in the last Session of Parliament, intituled, "An Act for making and maintaining a Navigable Canal from Kirkby Kendal, in the County of Westmorland, to West Houghton, in the County Palatine of Lancaster, and also a Navigable Branch from the said intended Canal at or near Borwick to or near Warton Cragg; and also another Navigable Branch, from, at, or near Gale Moss, by Chorley, to or near Duxbury, in the said County Palatine of Lancaster;" (Note: Westmoreland Canals Act 1792 (32 Geo. 3. c. 101)) and also for making a Navigable Branch from the said Canal, at or near Galgate to Glasson Dock in the said County Palatine of Lancaster.
Whitgift, Yorkshire (Drainage) Act 1793 (repealed)	33 Geo. 3. c. 108	3 June 1793
An Act for draining, dividing, enclosing, and improving all the Moor Lands in the Townships of Redness and Swinefleet, in the Parish of Whitgift, in the West Riding of the County of York. (Repealed by Reedness and Swinefleet Drainage Act 1884 (47 & 48 Vict. c. clxxxvii) (Note: Incorrectly cited as "47-8 V c clxxxviii" in the Chronological Table of the Statutes.))
South Holland Drainage Act 1793	33 Geo. 3. c. 109	3 June 1793
An Act for draining, preserving, and improving certain Lands lying in the several Parishes of Spalding, (including the Hamlets of Cowbet and Pea kill,) Weston, Moulton, Whaplode, Holbech, Fleet, Gedney, Sutton Saint Mary, and Sutton Saint Nicholas, otherwise Lutton, all in South Holland, in the County of Lincoln.
Barnsley Canal Act 1793	33 Geo. 3. c. 110	3 June 1793
An Act for making and maintaining a Navigable Canal from the River Calder, in the Township of Warmfield cum Heath, to or near the Town of Barnsley, and from thence to Barnby Bridge, in the Township of Cawthorne, in the West Riding of the County of York, and certain Railways and other Roads to communicate therewith.
Nutbrook Canal Act 1793	33 Geo. 3. c. 111	3 June 1793
An Act for making and maintaining a Navigable Canal from the Collieries at Shipley and West Hallam, in the County of Derby, to the Erewash Canal, in the Parish of Stanton by Dale, in the said County.
Stratford-upon-Avon Canal Act 1793	33 Geo. 3. c. 112	28 March 1793
An Act for making and maintaining a Navigable Canal from the Worcester and Birmingham Canal Navigation, in the Parish of King's Norton, into the Borough of Stratford-upon-Avon, and also certain Collateral Cuts from the said intended Canal.
Shrewsbury Canal Act 1793	33 Geo. 3. c. 113	3 June 1793
An Act for making and maintaining a Navigable Canal from the North End of the Shropshire Canal, in the Township of Rockwardine Wood, in the County of Salop, to the Town of Shrewsbury, in the said County.
Caistor Canal Act 1793 (repealed)	33 Geo. 3. c. 114	3 June 1793
An Act for making and maintaining a Navigable Canal from the River Ancholme, in the Parish of South Kelsey, in the County of Lincoln, into the Parish of Caistor, in the said County. (Repealed by Caistor Canal Act Revocation Order 1936 (SR&O 1936/1010))
Dearne and Dove Canal Act 1793	33 Geo. 3. c. 115	3 June 1793
An Act for making and maintaining a Navigable Canal from the River Dun Navigation Cut, in the Township of Swinton, to or near the Town of Barnsley, in the Parish of Silkstone, in the West Riding of the County of York, and certain Collateral Cuts branching out of the said Canal.
Lincoln Drainage Act 1793	33 Geo. 3. c. 116	3 June 1793
An Act for embanking and draining certain Salt Marshes and Low Lands, within the several Parishes of Spalding, Moulton, Whaplode, Holbech, and Gedney, in the County of Lincoln, and for preventing the same Marshes and Lands from being overflowed with the Sea; and for altering an Act, passed in the Thirty-first Year of the Reign of His present Majesty, intituled, "An Act for dividing and enclosing the Commons, Marshes, Droves, Waste Lands, and Grounds in the Parish of Gedney, and Hamlet thereof, called Gedney Fen, in the County of Lincoln." (Note: Gedney Fen Inclosure Act 1791 (31 Geo. 3. c. 49 Pr.))
Stainforth and Keadby Canal Act 1793	33 Geo. 3. c. 117	7 June 1793
An Act for making and maintaining a Navigable Canal from the River Dun Navigation Cut, at or near Stainforth, in the West Riding of the County of York, to join and communicate with the River Trent, at or near Keadby, in the County of Lincoln; and also a Collateral Cut from the said Canal to join the said River Dun, in the Parish of Thorne, in the said Riding.
Inverness Roads Act 1793 (repealed)	33 Geo. 3. c. 118	7 June 1793
An Act for making effectual the Statute Labour in the Shire of Inverness, and for levying Conversion Money in lieu of Labour; and for otherwise regulating, making, and repairing, Highways and Bridges in the said Shire; and for improving, widening, and lighting the Streets within the Royal Burgh of Inverness. (Repealed by Roads in Inverness Act 1808 (48 Geo. 3. c. cv) and Inverness County Roads, Bridges and Ferries Act 1830 (11 Geo. 4 & 1 Will. 4. c. lxxviii))
Herefordshire and Gloucestershire Canal Act 1793	33 Geo. 3. c. 119	11 June 1793
An Act to vary and extend the Line of the Canal authorized to be made by an Act passed in the Thirty-first Year of the Reign of His present Majesty, intituled, "An Act for making and maintaining a Navigable Canal from the City of Hereford to the City of Gloucester, with a Collateral Cut from the same to the Town of Newent, in the County of Gloucester;" (Note: Herefordshire and Gloucestershire Canal Act 1791 (31 Geo. 3. c. 89)) and to amend the said Act.
Caithness Roads Act 1793 (repealed)	33 Geo. 3. c. 120	11 June 1793
An Act for making effectual the Statute Labour, and for levying Conversion Money in Lieu of Labour in certain Cases; and for otherwise regulating, making, and repairing High Roads and Bridges in the County of Caithness. (Repealed by Roads in Caithness Act 1830 (11 Geo. 4 & 1 Will. 4. c. cii))
Selly Oak Canal Act 1793 (repealed)	33 Geo. 3. c. 121	17 June 1793
An Act for making and maintaining a Navigable Canal from the Dudley Canal, in the County of Worcester, to the Worcester and Birmingham Canal now making at or near Selly Oak, in the said County; and also certain Collateral Cuts to communicate therewith. (Repealed by Birmingham and Dudley Canal Consolidation Act 1846 (9 & 10 Vict. c. cclxix))
Trevaunance Harbour Act 1793	33 Geo. 3. c. 122	17 June 1793
An Act for erecting and making a Pier and Harbour in the Cove of Trevaunance, in the Parish of Saint Agnes, in the County of Cornwall.
Carnarvon Harbour Act 1793	33 Geo. 3. c. 123	17 June 1793
An Act for enlarging, deepening, cleansing, improving, and regulating the Harbour of Carnarvon, in the County of Carnarvon.
Glasgow Improvement Act 1793 (repealed)	33 Geo. 3. c. 124	17 June 1793
An Act for re-building the Tron Church of the City of Glasgow; for opening certain Streets; for removing Obstructions in the Trongate Street; for building a Bridge over the River Clyde, opposite to the Salt Market Street; for regulating the Weight and Measure of Coals, and the Mode of carrying Wood and Timber on the Streets of the said City; for enlarging the Goal or Tolbooth there; and for selling Part of the High or Calton Green, and also the Glebe belonging to the Inner High Church and Parish of Glasgow. (Repealed by Statute Law (Repeals) Act 1976 (c. 16))
Amlwch Harbour Act 1793 (repealed)	33 Geo. 3. c. 125	21 June 1793
An Act for enlarging, deepening, cleansing, improving, and regulating the Harbour of Amlwch, in the Isle of Anglesey. (Repealed by Pier and Harbour Orders Confirmation (No. 3) Act 1914 (4 & 5 Geo. 5. c. cxv))
Blything, Suffolk (Poor Relief, Guardians, etc.) Act 1793 (repealed)	33 Geo. 3. c. 126	3 June 1793
An Act for amending an Act made in the Fourth Year of His present Majesty's Reign, intituled, "An Act for the better Relief and Employment of the Poor in the Hundred of Blything, in the County of Suffolk;" (Note: Blything, Suffolk (Poor Relief) Act 1764 (4 Geo. 3. c. 56)) and for granting some further Powers and Provisions for carrying the same more effectually into Execution. (Repealed by Statute Law Revision Act 1948 (11 & 12 Geo. 6. c. 62))
Bedford Charities Act 1793 (repealed)	33 Geo. 3. c. 127	17 June 1793
An Act for repealing an Act, made in the fourth year of the reign of his present Majesty, intituled, "An Act for enlarging the charitable use, extending the objects, and regulating the application of the rents and profits of the estates given by Sir William Harpur, knight, and dame Alice his wife, for the benefit of the poor, and other objects of charity, of the town of Bedford;" (Note: Harpur Trust Act 1764 (4 Geo. 3. c. 72 Pr.)) and for the better management and disposition of the said estates, and the rents and profits thereof. (Repealed by Bedford School Act 1826 (7 Geo. 4. c. 29))
Ipswich and Yaxley Roads Act 1793 (repealed)	33 Geo. 3. c. 128	28 February 1793
An Act for more effectually repairing the Roads from Ipswich to the Scole Inn Road, and from Claydon to the Bury Saint Edmunds Road, at the End of the Bounds of the Parish of Hawleigh; and from Yaxley Bull to Eye, and from Eye to Lanthorn Green, in the County of Suffolk. (Repealed by Suffolk Roads Act 1811 (51 Geo. 3. c. cviii), Annual Turnpike Acts Continuance Act 1869 (32 & 33 Vict. c. 90) and Statute Law (Repeals) Act 2008 (c. 12))
Wakefield and Halifax Roads Act 1793 (repealed)	33 Geo. 3. c. 129	6 March 1793
An Act for reviving, continuing, and amending certain Acts of the Fourteenth (Note: Wakefield, etc., Roads Act 1740 (14 Geo. 2. c. 19)) and Thirtieth (Note: Yorkshire Roads Act 1757 (30 Geo. 2. c. 54)) Years of King George the Second, so far as relates to repairing the Road from the North End of Wakefield Bridge to Halifax, in the West Riding of the County of York. (Repealed by Wakefield and Halifax Road Act 1828 (9 Geo. 4. c. lxix))
Cambridge to Royston Road Act 1793 (repealed)	33 Geo. 3. c. 130	30 April 1793
An Act for repairing the Roads from the Town of Cambridge, to a Place called Long Leys, and from the said Town of Cambridge to Royston, in the Counties of Cambridge and Essex. (Repealed by Roads from Cambridge to Chishill and to Royston Act 1828 (9 Geo. 4. c. xxxvi))
Uttoxeter to Stoke Road Act 1793 (repealed)	33 Geo. 3. c. 131	28 March 1793
An Act for amending, widening, altering, and keeping in Repair the Road leading from Uttoxeter to the Westwardly Part of Hardiwick Heath, and for setting out and making a new Road from thence to Stoke near Stone; and for amending, widening, altering, and keeping in Repair the Road leading from the Village of Millwich to Sandon, in the County of Stafford. (Repealed by Roads from Uttoxeter and from Millwich Act 1815 (55 Geo. 3. c. liv) and Uttoxeter and Stoke near Stone, Millwich and Sandon Turnpike Roads Act 1851 (14 & 15 Vict. c. lx))
Ledbury Roads Act 1793 (repealed)	33 Geo. 3. c. 132	28 March 1793
An Act for enlarging the Term and altering the Powers of an Act passed in the Twenty-ninth Year of the Reign of His present Majesty King George the Third, intituled, "An Act for more effectually repairing several Roads leading from Ledbury in the County of Hereford, and the Road through the Parish of Bromesberrow, in the County of Gloucester, and Corse Lawn till it joins the Road from Gloucester to Worcester." (Note: Hereford and Gloucester Roads Act 1789 (29 Geo. 3. c. 104)) (Repealed by Roads from Ledbury (Herefordshire, Gloucestershire) Act 1833 (3 & 4 Will. 4. c. lviii))
Glamorgan Roads Act 1793 (repealed)	33 Geo. 3. c. 133	28 March 1793
An Act for opening and making a new Road from the Turnpike Road at Craig Evan Leyson, in the Parish of Lanvabon, to the Confines of the Parish of Ystradyvoduck near Abernant, in the County of Glamorgan. (Repealed by South Wales Turnpike Trusts Act 1844 (7 & 8 Vict. c. 91))
Blackburn to Burscough Bridge Road Act 1793 (repealed)	33 Geo. 3. c. 134	28 March 1793
An Act for more effectually repairing the Road from Blackburn to Burscough Bridge, in the County of Lancaster. (Repealed by Blackburn and Walton-in-le-Dale Road Act 1830 (11 Geo. 4 & 1 Will. 4. c. lxxxv))
Hampton to Staines Road Act 1793 (repealed)	33 Geo. 3. c. 135	28 March 1793
An Act for continuing and amending an Act passed in the Thirteenth Year of His present Majesty King George the Third, intituled, "An Act for amending, widening, and keeping in Repair the Road from the Guide Post at the West End of the Town of Hampton, over Sunbury Common to the Town of Staines, in the County of Middlesex." (Note: Hampton to Staines Road Act 1773 (13 Geo. 3. c. 105)) (Repealed by Hampton and Staines Road Act 1814 (54 Geo. 3. c. lix) and Annual Turnpike Acts Continuance Act 1860 (23 & 24 Vict. c. 73))
Bawtry to Markham Road Act 1793 (repealed)	33 Geo. 3. c. 136	28 March 1793
An Act to continue the Term, and alter and enlarge the Powers of an Act passed in the Sixth Year of the Reign of His present Majesty, (Note: Bawtry to Markham Road Act 1766 (6 Geo. 3. c. 67)) for repairing and widening the Road from Bawtry, in the County of York, to East Markham Common, in the County of Nottingham, and from Little Drayton to Twiford Bridge, in the said County. (Repealed by Road from Bawtry and from Little Drayton Act 1813 (53 Geo. 3. c. xi) and Annual Turnpike Acts Continuance Act 1872 (35 & 36 Vict. c. 85))
Witney to Clanfield Road Act 1793 (repealed)	33 Geo. 3. c. 137	28 March 1793
An Act for continuing the Term of an Act of the Eleventh Year of His present Majesty, (Note: Oxford Roads Act 1771 (11 Geo. 3. c. 73)) for amending, widening, turning, and altering the Road from the Bottom of Galley Hill, near the Town of Witney, to the Cross in Clanfield, in the County of Oxford. (Repealed by Witney and Clanfield Road Act 1815 (55 Geo. 3. c. xxxviii), Annual Turnpike Acts Continuance Act 1874 (37 & 38 Vict. c. 95) and Statute Law (Repeals) Act 2013 (c. 2))
Berkshire and Wiltshire Roads Act 1793 (repealed)	33 Geo. 3. c. 138	28 March 1793
An Act for continuing the Term, and altering and enlarging the Powers of an Act made in the Tenth Year of the Reign of His present Majesty, (Note: Berks and Wilts Roads Act 1770 (10 Geo. 3. c. 100)) for repairing the Highways from Speenhamland, in the County of Berks, to Marlborough, in the County of Wilts; and several other Roads therein mentioned. (Repealed by Speenhamland Roads Act 1816 (56 Geo. 3. c. lxxx), Speenhamland and Marlborough Road Act 1827 (7 & 8 Geo. 4. c. lii) and Annual Turnpike Acts Continuance Act 1876 (39 & 40 Vict. c. 39))
Manchester to Chester Roads Act 1793 (repealed)	33 Geo. 3. c. 139	28 March 1793
An Act for repairing and amending the Roads leading from the Town of Manchester, in the County of Lancaster, through the Town of Ashton-under-Line, and Parish of Mottram Longdendale, and from thence to Salter's Brook, in the County Palatine of Chester. (Repealed by Ardwick Green and Wilmslow Road Act 1799 (39 Geo. 3. c. lxiv), Manchester and Salter's Brook Road Act 1818 (58 Geo. 3. c. ix) and Manchester and Salters Brook Roads Act 1826 (7 Geo. 4. c. xvi))
Yorkshire Derby and Chester Roads Act 1793 (repealed)	33 Geo. 3. c. 140	28 March 1793
An Act for making and maintaining a Road from or nearly from French Top, in the Parish of Saddleworth, in the West Riding of the County of York, to Brookhouses in the Parish of Glossop, in the County of Derby, and for repairing and altering the Road leading from or nearly from a Close called Copley Meadow in Stayley, to or near to Stayley Bridge, in the County of Chester. (Repealed by French Top and Stayley Road (Yorkshire, Cheshire) Act 1838 (1 & 2 Vict. c. xl))
Stafford Roads Act 1793 (repealed)	33 Geo. 3. c. 141	28 March 1793
An Act to enlarge the Terms and Powers of two Acts of Parliament, the one passed in the Fifth Year of the Reign of His present Majesty, (Note: Stafford Roads Act 1765 (5 Geo. 3. c. 84)) for repairing and widening the Road from Newcastle-under-Line to Hassop, and from Middle Hills to the Macclesfield Turnpike Road near Buxton, and also the Road branching out of the said first mentioned Road at Cobridge to Burslem, and to the Uttoxeter Turnpike Road at Shetton, in the County of Stafford; and the other passed in the Thirteenth Year of the Reign of His said Majesty, (Note: Staffordshire Roads Act 1773 (13 Geo. 3. c. 100)) to enlarge the Term and Powers of the said Act, and for amending several other Roads therein described. (Repealed by Newcastle-under-Lyme and Leek Roads Act 1828 (9 Geo. 4. c. iv) and Leek, Buxton and Monyash Turnpike Road Act 1852 (15 & 16 Vict. c. cxv))
Halifax to Sheffield Road Act 1793 (repealed)	33 Geo. 3. c. 142	28 March 1793
An Act for continuing the Term, and altering and enlarging the Powers of an Act of Parliament, of the Seventeenth Year of His present Majesty, (Note: Halifax to Sheffield Road Act 1777 (17 Geo. 3. c. 106)) for repairing and widening the Road from the Town of Halifax, in the West Riding of the County of York, to the Town of Sheffield in the same Riding, so far as relates to the first District of the Roads mentioned in the said Act. (Repealed by Halifax to Sheffield Road (First District) Act 1824 (5 Geo. 4. c. ciii))
Little Bowden and Rockingham Road Act 1793 (repealed)	33 Geo. 3. c. 143	28 March 1793
An Act for repairing and widening the Road from the Foot of a certain Bridge in the Parish of Little Bowden, in the County of Northampton, commonly called Saint Mary's Bridge, to the West Side of the Toll Bar at the North End of the Town of Rockingham, in the said County. (Repealed by Little Bowden and Rockingham Road Act 1813 (53 Geo. 3. c. iv) and Little Bowden and Rockingham Road Act 1835 (5 & 6 Will. 4. c. xix))
Bath Roads Act 1793 (repealed)	33 Geo. 3. c. 144	17 June 1793
An Act for amending, improving, and keeping in Repair, several Roads leading to and from the City of Bath. (Repealed by Bath Roads Act 1810 (50 Geo. 3. c. cliii))
Essex Roads Act 1793 (repealed)	33 Geo. 3. c. 145	17 June 1793
An Act for repairing the Roads leading from the Western Part of the Parish of Shenfield to Harwich and Rochford, and from Chelmsford to Ballingdon Bridge, and from Margaretting to Malden, and from Colchester to Dedham Bridge and from Lexden to the East End of the Town of Haverill, and from High Garrett to Bulmer Tie and from Mark's Tey to Braintree, and from Little Waltham to the End of the Parish of Great Hallingbury, and from Malden to Braintree, in the County of Essex. (Repealed by Road from Shenfield to Harwich Act 1815 (55 Geo. 3. c. xc), Annual Turnpike Acts Continuance Act 1866 (29 & 30 Vict. c. 105) and Statute Law (Repeals) Act 2008 (c. 12))
Cockerton Bridge to Staindrop Road Act 1793 (repealed)	33 Geo. 3. c. 146	30 April 1793
An Act for repairing the High Road leading from Cockerton Bridge, near Darlington, in the County of Durham, to Staindrop, in the said County. (Repealed by Darlington and West Auckland and Cockerton Bridge and Staindrop Roads Act 1835 (5 & 6 Will. 4. c. xxv))
Wolverhampton Roads Act 1793 (repealed)	33 Geo. 3. c. 147	30 April 1793
An Act to enlarge the Term and Powers of an Act passed in the Twelfth Year of the Reign of His present Majesty, (Note: Wolverhampton Roads Act 1772 (12 Geo. 3. c. 101)) intituled, "An Act to continue the Term and vary the Powers of so much of an Act made in the Twenty-first Year of the Reign of His late Majesty, (Note: Wolverhampton Roads Act 1747 (21 Geo. 2. c. 25)) for repairing the Road from Sutton Coldfield Common, and several other Roads therein described, in the County of Stafford, as relates to the Wolverhampton District of Roads." (Repealed by Wolverhampton Roads in Staffordshire and Salop Act 1831 (1 & 2 Will. 4. c. xxv))
Durham Roads Act 1793 (repealed)	33 Geo. 3. c. 148	30 April 1793
An Act for repairing, widening, and altering the Road from the Turnpike Road between Gateshead and Hexham, near Lobley Hill, in the Parish of Whickham, in the County of Durham, to Burtry Ford, in the Parish of Stanhope, in the same County, and a Branch from the said Road, near Bryan's Leap, in the County of Durham, to the Corbridge Turnpike Road near Blackhedley, in the County of Northumberland; and another Branch from the said Road at Wolsingham, in the County of Durham, to Crosgate, near the City of Durham. (Repealed by Lobley Hill and Burtryford Roads (Durham) Act 1837 (7 Will. 4 & 1 Vict. c. xvi))
Essex Roads (No. 2) Act 1793 (repealed)	33 Geo. 3. c. 149	30 April 1793
An Act for repairing and widening the Roads from Hadley Turnpike Gate to Stifford Bridge, and from a Farm House called Tarpotts, to the Town of South Benfleet, and from the Pound in the Town of Brentwood to Tilbury Fort, and from Billericay to Horndon-on-the-Hill, and from Stanford Bridge to Purfleet, in the County of Essex. (Repealed by Statute Law (Repeals) Act 2008 (c. 12))
Lincoln Roads Act 1793 (repealed)	33 Geo. 3. c. 150	30 April 1793
An Act for widening, turning, altering, repairing, and maintaining the Road leading from the East Side of the Market Place in New Sleaford, to and through the Town of Anwick, in the County of Lincoln, and for making public the Drove Road from the said Town of Anwick to Kyme Praie Grounds, and for making a Road from thence to join the present Road near North Kyme Town; and for widening, turning, altering, repairing, and maintaining the Road leading from thence, through the said Town of North Kyme, near Billinghay Dales, to the River Witham, and also the Road from the opposite Shore of the said River to the Town of Tattershall, in the said County of Lincoln; and for building a Bridge over the Witham, at or near to Tattershall Ferry. (Repealed by Sleaford and Tattershall Road Act 1856 (19 & 20 Vict. c. xxviii))
St. Neots to Cambridge Road Act 1793 (repealed)	33 Geo. 3. c. 151	30 April 1793
An Act to continue the Term and Powers of an Act made in the Twelfth Year of the Reign of His present Majesty, intituled, "An Act for repairing and widening the Road from the West End of Saint Ive's Lane, in the Town of Saint Neots, in the County of Huntingdon, to the Pavement at the End of Bell Lane, in the Town of Cambridge." (Note: St. Neots to Cambridge Road Act 1772 (12 Geo. 3. c. 90)) (Repealed by St. Neots and Cambridge Road Act 1813 (54 Geo. 3. c. iv) and Annual Turnpike Acts Continuance Act 1874 (37 & 38 Vict. c. 95))
Derby Roads Act 1793 (repealed)	33 Geo. 3. c. 152	7 May 1793
An Act for repairing and widening the Road from the Moot Hall, in Wirksworth to the Turnpike Road leading from Derby to Brassington, at or near to a Place called the Cross in the Hand, on Hulland Ward, and also the Road from the Moot Hall to another Turnpike Road leading from the Cross-Post on Wirksworth Moor to Matlock Bath, at or near to a Place called the Steeple House, in the Township of Wirksworth aforesaid, all in the County of Derby. (Repealed by Roads from Wirksworth Act 1820 (1 Geo. 4. c. iii) and Roads from the Wirksworth Turnpike Road Act 1830 (11 Geo. 4 & 1 Will. 4. c. cv))
Stafford and Salop Roads Act 1793 (repealed)	33 Geo. 3. c. 153	7 May 1793
An Act for repairing, widening, diverting, and improving the Road from Stafford to Church Bridge, and also the Road from Stafford to Uttoxeter, all in the County of Stafford, and also the Road from Stafford to Newport, in the County of Salop. (Repealed by Stafford, Church Bridge and Uttoxeter Road, and Road from Stafford to Newport (Salop.) Act 1834 (4 & 5 Will. 4. c. lix))
Brecon Roads Act 1793 (repealed)	33 Geo. 3. c. 154	7 May 1793
An Act for continuing the Term and varying the Powers of an Act of the Twelfth Year of His present Majesty, (Note: Brecon Roads Act 1772 (12 Geo. 3. c. 105)) for amending, widening, and altering the Road from Crickhowell, in the County of Brecon, to the Cross Hands beyond New Inn, in the Turnpike Road between the City of Hereford and Ross, and other Roads therein described; with respect to certain Parts of the Roads comprized in the said Act. (Repealed by Ross and Abergavenny Road Act 1833 (3 & 4 Will. 4. c. lxi))
Wiltshire and Somerset Roads Act 1793 (repealed)	33 Geo. 3. c. 155	7 May 1793
An Act for continuing the Terms, and altering, enlarging and consolidating the Powers of two Acts of Parliament, passed in the Twenty-ninth Year of the Reign of His late Majesty King George the Second (Note: Bruton Roads Act 1756 (29 Geo. 2. c. 50)) and in the Seventeenth Year of the Reign of His present Majesty, (Note: Bruton Roads Act 1777 (17 Geo. 3. c. 95)) for repairing and widening several Roads and Streets in and near the Town of Brewton, in the County of Somerset, therein described; and also for repairing, widening and altering several other Roads in the Counties of Somerset and Wilts. (Repealed by Bruton (or Brewton) Roads Act 1831 (1 Will. 4. c. lxvi) (Note: Cited as "W 4 c lxvi", without a regnal year, in the Chronological Table of the Statutes.))
Godmanchester to Cambridge Road Act 1793 (repealed)	33 Geo. 3. c. 156	10 May 1793
An Act to continue the Terms of two several Acts passed in the Eighteenth Year of the Reign of His late Majesty King George the Second, (Note: Huntingdonshire and Cambridgeshire Roads Act 1744 (18 Geo. 2. c. 23)) and in the Third Year of the Reign of His present Majesty, (Note: Cambridge and Newmarket Road Act 1763 (3 Geo. 3. c. 30)) for repairing and widening the Road leading from Godmanchester in the County of Huntingdon, through Fen Stanton and Cambridge, to the first Rubbing House on Newmarket Heath, in the County of Cambridge. (Repealed by Godmanchester and Cambridge Road Act 1813 (53 Geo. 3. c. xli) and Cambridge to Newmarket Heath Road Act 1815 (55 Geo. 3. c. xlix))
Hedon and Hull Road Act 1793 (repealed)	33 Geo. 3. c. 157	10 May 1793
An Act for continuing the Term and enlarging the Powers of two Acts passed in the Eighteenth Year of the Reign of His late Majesty King George the Second, (Note: Hedon and Hull Road Act 1744 (18 Geo. 2. c. 6)) and the Seventh Year of the Reign of His present Majesty, (Note: Hedon and Hull Road Act 1766 (7 Geo. 3. c. 71)) for repairing the Road leading from a Gate, commonly called Sacred Gate, on the South East Side of the Town of Hedon, in the East Riding of County of York, through the said Town, to Hull North Bridge; and for amending the Road from the present Turnpike Bar in Wyton Holmes, through the Townships of Wyton and Sproatley, to the Guide Post in Flinton Lane, near Humbleton Moor House, in the same Riding. (Repealed by Hendon and Hull and Wyton and Flinton Turnpike Roads Act 1855 (18 & 19 Vict. c. cxxxvi))
Perth Roads Act 1793 (repealed)	33 Geo. 3. c. 158	10 May 1793
An Act for explaining, amending, and rendering more effectual an Act passed in the Twenty-ninth Year of His present Majesty's Reign, (Note: Perth Roads Act 1789 (29 Geo. 3. c. 17)) for repairing certain Roads in the County of Perth; and for making and repairing the Road from Crieff towards Stirling and Alloa, and other Roads in the said County. (Repealed by Roads and Bridges in Perthshire Act 1811 (51 Geo. 3. c. cxcviii))
Hemingbrough to Market Weighton Road Act 1793 (repealed)	33 Geo. 3. c. 159	10 May 1793
An Act for repairing and widening the Road from Selby Ferry, in the Parish of Hemingbrough, to the Town of Market Weighton, in the East Riding of the County of York. (Repealed by Selby and Market Weighton Turnpike Road Act 1857 (20 & 21 Vict. c. lxv))
Glasgow Roads Act 1793 (repealed)	33 Geo. 3. c. 160	3 June 1793
An Act for completing, repairing, and maintaining the Road leading from the City of Glasgow to Port Dundas, and from Port Dundas to the High Road leading from the City of Glasgow to Garscube Bridge, by Dobbie's Loan, in the County of Lanerk. (Repealed by Port Dundas and Glasgow Roads Act 1835 (5 & 6 Will. 4. c. cix))
Durham Roads (No. 2) Act 1793	33 Geo. 3. c. 161	3 June 1793
An Act for continuing the Term, and altering, enlarging, and consolidating the Powers of Two Acts of Parliament, passed in the Twenty-first (Note: Durham Roads (No. 2) Act 1793 (21 Geo. 2. c. 27)) and Twenty-seventh (Note: Durham Roads Act 1754 (27 Geo. 2. c. 29)) Years of the Reign of His late Majesty, King George the Second, for repairing the High Road from Pierce Bridge to Kirk Merrington, in the County of Durham, and from thence to the Turnpike Road at Tudhoe Lane End, in the same County.
Kent Roads Act 1793 (repealed)	33 Geo. 3. c. 162	3 June 1793
An Act for amending, improving, and keeping in Repair the Road from the North End of Marsh Lane, in Ashford, in the County of Kent, to the End of the Parish of Orlestone, near Stockbridge, in Romney Marsh, in the said County. (Repealed by Ashford and Romney Marsh Road Act 1814 (54 Geo. 3. c. xxvii) and Annual Turnpike Acts Continuance Act 1877 (40 & 41 Vict. c. 64))
Haddington Roads Act 1793 (repealed)	33 Geo. 3. c. 163	3 June 1793
An Act for enlarging the Term and Powers of Two Acts, of the Twenty-third Year of the Reign of His late Majesty King George the Second, (Note: Haddington County Roads Act 1749 (23 Geo. 2. c. 17)) and the Ninth Year of the Reign of His present Majesty, (Note: Haddington Roads Act 1769 (9 Geo. 3. c. 74)) for repairing the High Roads from Dunglass Bridge to the Town of Haddington, and from thence to Ravenshaugh Burn, in the County of Haddington; and for making, amending, widening, and keeping in Repair certain Branches of the said Roads, within the said County. (Repealed by Haddington Roads Act 1811 (51 Geo. 3. c. cxxvii))
Warrington to Wigan Road Act 1793 (repealed)	33 Geo. 3. c. 164	3 June 1793
An Act to enlarge the Term and Powers of an Act, made in the Tenth Year of the Reign of His present Majesty, (Note: Warrington and Wigan Road Act 1770 (10 Geo. 3. c. 70)) for the more effectual repairing, widening, and amending the Road from a Place called Earl's Kill, in Warrington, to the Toll Bars in Wallgate, in Wigan, both in the County of Lancaster. (Repealed by Warrington and Wigan Road Act 1813 (53 Geo. 3. c. cxxxi) and Warrington and Wigan Road (Lancashire) Act 1833 (3 & 4 Will. 4. c. lxxiv))
Somerset Roads Act 1793 (repealed)	33 Geo. 3. c. 165	3 June 1793
An Act, for making, amending, diverting, and widening the Roads leading from West Harptry to the Bath and Wells Turnpike Road, at Marksbury; and from Stowey to Chew Magna; and from West Harptry to the Bath Turnpike Road at Emborow; and from West Harptry to Fore Cross, in the Parish of Churchill; and from West Harptry to the Blue Bowl Inn, in Compton Martin; and from Berrington to the Town of Wrington; and from the Nine Elms at North Wedcombe to Coley, in the County of Somerset. (Repealed by West Harptree Road Act 1853 (16 & 17 Vict. c. clxii))
Bawtry by Selby Road Act 1793 (repealed)	33 Geo. 3. c. 166	3 June 1793
An Act for making and maintaining a commodious Carriage Road from the Town of Bawtry to the Town of Selby, in the West Riding of the County of York. (Repealed by Bawtry and Selby Road Act 1832 (2 & 3 Will. 4. c. lxxiii))
Stafford Roads (No. 2) Act 1793 (repealed)	33 Geo. 3. c. 167	3 June 1793
An Act for amending, widening, and keeping in Repair the Roads leading from Womborne to Prince's End, and from Gospel End to the Village of Over Penn, and from thence to the Turnpike Road leading from Wolverhampton to Stourbridge; and from Chitt's Grave to or near Prince's End; and from Can Lane to the Town of Bilston, in the County of Stafford. (Repealed by Sedgley Roads (Staffordshire) Act 1841 (4 & 5 Vict. c. ciii))
Hungerford to Leckford Road Act 1793 (repealed)	33 Geo. 3. c. 168	3 June 1793
An Act for enlarging the Term and Powers of an Act, passed in the Twelfth Year of the Reign of His present Majesty, (Note: Wiltshire Roads (No. 2) Act 1772 (12 Geo. 3. c. 85)) for repairing and widening the Road from the End of the present Turnpike Road, from Besselsleigh to Hungerford, in the County of Berks, to Leckford, otherwise Sousley Water, in the County of Wilts. (Repealed by Hungerford and Leckford Road Act 1814 (54 Geo. 3. c. lxxxv) and Annual Turnpike Acts Continuance Act 1865 (28 & 29 Vict. c. 107))
Monmouth Roads Act 1793 (repealed)	33 Geo. 3. c. 169	3 June 1793
An Act to enlarge the Term and Powers of Two Acts, of the Twenty-eighth Year of King George the Second, (Note: Monmouth Roads Act 1755 (28 Geo. 2. c. 31)) and the Seventeenth Year of His present Majesty, (Note: Monmouth Roads Act 1777 (17 Geo. 3. c. 96)) for repairing and amending the several Roads therein mentioned, leading to, through, and from the Town of Monmouth. (Repealed by Monmouth Roads Act 1831 (1 & 2 Will. 4. c. xviii))
Manchester to Wilmslow Road Act 1793 (repealed)	33 Geo. 3. c. 170	3 June 1793
An Act for repairing, widening, altering, diverting, and turning the Road from Ardwick Green, near Manchester, in the County of Lancaster, to the New Bridge at the Corn Mills at Wilmslow, in the County of Chester. (Repealed by Manchester and Wilmslow Road Act 1818 (58 Geo. 3. c. xii))
Manchester to Buxton Road Act 1793 (repealed)	33 Geo. 3. c. 171	3 June 1793
An Act for repairing, widening, altering, diverting, and turning the Road from Hurdlow House, (Note: The Bull I' Th' Thorn inn on the A515 Ashbourne Road at Hurdlow was formerly called Hurdlow House. 53°11′44″N 1°48′37″W) through Buxton, in the County of Derby, and Stockport, in the County of Chester, to Manchester, in the County of Lancaster; and also the Road from Hernestone Lane Head, and from Sparrow Pit Gate, through Chapel in le Frith, all in the said County of Derby, to the last-mentioned Road at Whaley, in the said County of Chester. (Repealed by Road from Hurdlow House to Manchester Act 1821 (1 & 2 Geo. 4. c. xviii))
Salop Roads Act 1793 (repealed)	33 Geo. 3. c. 172	3 June 1793
An Act for continuing the Term, and altering and enlarging the Powers of Two several Acts, made in Twenty-ninth Year of His late Majesty King George the Second, (Note: Shropshire Roads (No. 2) Act 1756 (29 Geo. 2. c. 64)) and Twenty-seventh Year of His present Majesty, (Note: Salop Roads Act 1787 (27 Geo. 3. c. 85)) for repairing the Road from Shrewsbury to Preston Brockhurst, to Shawbury, and to Shreyhill, and other Roads, in the County of Salop; and for repairing the Road leading from the Turnpike Road from Shrewsbury to Ellesmere, through Harlscott, Uffington, and Berwick, to Atcham, in the said County. (Repealed by Road from Shrewsbury to Preston Brockhurst Act 1819 (59 Geo. 3. c. lxxxvi))
Maidstone to Ashford Road Act 1793 (repealed)	33 Geo. 3. c. 173	3 June 1793
An Act for amending, widening, shortening, improving, and keeping in Repair the Road from Wren's Cross, in the Town of Maidstone, in the County of Kent, through the West or Lower Harrietsham-street, by Harrietsham Church, and through Lenham and Charing to Barrow Hill, in Ashford, in the said County. (Repealed by Ashford and Maidstone Road Act 1814 (54 Geo. 3. c. xviii))
Glasgow Roads (No. 2) Act 1793 (repealed)	33 Geo. 3. c. 174	3 June 1793
An Act for enlarging the Term and Powers of an Act passed in the Twenty-sixth Year of the Reign of his late Majesty King George the Second, intituled, "An Act for repairing several Roads leading into the City of Glasgow;" (Note: Glasgow Roads Act 1753 (26 Geo. 2. c. 90)) and of another Act passed in the Twenty-seventh Year of the Reign of His said late Majesty, (Note: Glasgow Roads Act 1754 (27 Geo. 2. c. 27)) to explain, amend, and render more effectual the said Act; and of another Act passed in the Fourteenth Year of the Reign of His present Majesty, (Note: Glasgow Roads Act 1774 (14 Geo. 3. c. 102)) for enlarging the Term and Powers of two Acts, made in the Twenty-sixth and Twenty-seventh Years of the Reign of His late Majesty King George the Second, for repairing several Roads leading into the City of Glasgow, so far as the same relate to the Road leading from the said City of Glasgow, through Cowcaddens, to that Part of the Water of Kelvin called the Milnford of Garscube. (Repealed by Road from Glasgow to Garscube Act 1809 (49 Geo. 3. c. xxx))
Worcester Roads Act 1793 (repealed)	33 Geo. 3. c. 175	3 June 1793
An Act for more effectually amending and keeping in Repair the Road from the City of Worcester, through Droitwich, to Spadesbourne Bridge, within the Parish of Bromesgrove, in the County of Worcester, and other Roads therein mentioned. (Repealed by Road from Worcester through Droitwich to Bromsgrove Act 1824 (5 Geo. 4. c. xxxiii))
Market Harborough to Loughborough Road Act 1793 (repealed)	33 Geo. 3. c. 176	7 June 1793
An Act for enlarging the Term and Powers of an Act passed in the Eleventh Year of the Reign of His present Majesty, (Note: Leicester Roads Act 1771 (11 Geo. 3. c. 88)) intituled, "An Act to continue and render more effectual Two Acts passed in the Twelfth Year of the Reign of King George the First, (Note: Leicestershire Road Act 1725 (12 Geo. 1. c. 5)) and the Nineteenth Year of the Reign of His late Majesty (Note: Leicester Roads Act 1745 (19 Geo. 2. c. 10)) for repairing the Road from Market Harborough, in the County of Leicester; and for repairing, widening, turning, and altering the Road branching out of the aforesaid Road, at a Place called Filling Gate, to a Road called the Foss Road, and from thence to the Turnpike Road leading from Melton Mowbray to the Guide Post in Saint Margaret's Field, Leicester." (Repealed by Market Harborough and Loughborough Road Act 1813 (53 Geo. 3. c. xxiii) and Roads from Market Harborough to Loughborough Act 1830 (11 Geo. 4 & 1 Will. 4. c. iii))
Heage to Duffield Road Act 1793 (repealed)	33 Geo. 3. c. 177	7 June 1793
An Act for repairing, widening, altering, and improving the Road from Heage, in the County of Derby, through Belper, to Duffield, in the said County. (Repealed by Duffield, Belper and Heage Road (Derbyshire) Act 1835 (5 & 6 Will. 4. c. xli))
Bedford Roads Act 1793 (repealed)	33 Geo. 3. c. 178	11 June 1793
An Act for enlarging the Term and Powers of an Act passed in the Twelfth Year of the Reign of His present Majesty, intituled, "An Act for repairing and widening the Road from the Forty-eighth Mile Stone in the Parish of Cardington, in the present Turnpike Road between Hitchin and Bedford, to Great Barford Bridge; and for continuing a Road from thence to the Great Northern Road near Temsford Bridge, in the County of Bedford." (Note: Bedford Roads (No. 2) Act 1772 (12 Geo. 3. c. 107)) (Repealed by Roads from Cardington and from Roxton Hill Act 1814 (54 Geo. 3. c. xvii) and Annual Turnpike Acts Continuance Act 1869 (32 & 33 Vict. c. 90))
Wakefield to Abberford Road Act 1793 (repealed)	33 Geo. 3. c. 179	30 April 1793
An Act for continuing the Term and altering and enlarging the Powers of an Act of Parliament of the Twenty-ninth Year of the Reign of His present Majesty, (Note: Wakefield to Abberford Road Act 1789 (29 Geo. 3. c. 86)) for repairing and widening the Road from the Town of Wakefield to the Town of Abberford, in the West Riding of the County of York. (Repealed by Wakefield and Aberford Road Act 1831 (1 Will. 4. c. xxxv))
Bicester Roads Act 1793 (repealed)	33 Geo. 3. c. 180	30 April 1793
An Act for amending, widening, and repairing the Road from Clay Hill, in the Turnpike Road between Neat Enstone and Chipping Norton, in the County of Oxford, over Heyford Bridge, to the Water Lane, in the Town of Bicester, in the said County, and from Bicester aforesaid to the Turnpike Road in Weston-on-the-Green, in the said County. (Repealed by Road from Neat Enstone and Chipping Norton Turnpike Road to Weston-on-the-Green (Oxfordshire) Act 1813 (53 Geo. 3. c. cxxxiii), Annual Turnpike Acts Continuance Act 1876 (39 & 40 Vict. c. 39) and Statute Law (Repeals) Act 2013 (c. 2))
Lancaster Roads Act 1793 (repealed)	33 Geo. 3. c. 181	17 June 1793
An Act for more effectually repairing, widening, and improving certain Roads leading to and from the Towns of Salford, Warrington, Bolton, and Wigan, and to certain Places called the Broad Oak, in Worsley, and Duxbury Stocks, and also the Road from a Place called South Sea, in Pendlebury, to Agecroft Bridge, and from thence, through Hilton-Lane, to Dawson Lane End; and also from Agecroft Bridge, over Kersal Moor, to Singleton Brook, all in the County Palatine of Lancaster. (Repealed by West Houghton and Duxbury Stocks Road Act 1817 (57 Geo. 3. c. x), Warrington and Lower Irlam Road Act 1818 (58 Geo. 3. c. xlii), Moses Gate District of Road (Lancashire) Act 1821 (1 & 2 Geo. 4. c. lxxx) (Note: Incorrectly cited as "1-2 G 4 c lxxxi" in the Chronological Table of the Statutes.), Road from Wigan through Hindley Act 1825 (6 Geo. 4. c. xxii) and Pendleton Roads (Lancashire) Act 1826 (7 Geo. 4. c. cxxxviii))
Odiham to Alton Road Act 1793 (repealed)	33 Geo. 3. c. 182	17 June 1793
An Act for repairing and widening the Road from Odiham to Alton, in the County of Southampton. (Repealed by Basingstoke, Odiham and Alton Roads Act 1839 (2 & 3 Vict. c. xlv))
Kent Roads (No. 2) Act 1793 (repealed)	33 Geo. 3. c. 183	17 June 1793
An Act for enlarging the Term and Powers of an Act passed in the Tenth Year of the Reign of His present Majesty, (Note: Kent and Sussex Roads Act 1770 (10 Geo. 3. c. 108)) intituled, "An Act for continuing, amending, and rendering more effectual so much of Three Acts of Parliament (Note: Sevenoaks and Tunbridge Highways Act 1709 (8 Ann. c. 20)) (Note: Kent Roads (No. 2) Act 1724 (11 Geo. 1. c. 15)) (Note: Kent and Sussex Roads Act 1740 (14 Geo. 2. c. 12)) for repairing the Roads from Seven Oaks, Tunbridge Wells, and Kipping's Cross, to Lamberhurst Pound and Pullen's Hill, in the County of Kent, and to Flimwell Vent, in the County of Sussex, as relates to the Road leading from Seven Oaks Common to Woodsgate, Tunbridge Wells, and Kipping's Cross, in the said County of Kent; and for amending, widening, and keeping in Repair, the Road from Tunbridge Wells to Woodgate aforesaid." (Repealed by Sevenoaks and Tunbridge Wells Roads Act 1814 (54 Geo. 3. c. clxxiv))
Yorkshire and Derbyshire Roads Act 1793	33 Geo. 3. c. 184	21 June 1793
An Act for reviving, continuing, and amending an Act passed in the Eleventh Year of the Reign of His present Majesty, (Note: Yorkshire and Derby Roads Act 1771 (11 Geo. 3. c. 76)) for repairing and widening the Road leading from Penistone Bridge, in the County of York, to Grindleford Bridge, in the County of Derby; and the Roads severally leading from Bamford Woodgate, over Yorkshire Bridge, to the Guide Post on Thornhill Moor, to or near the Eighth Mile Stone on Hathersage Moor, and to the Village of Darwent, in the said County of Derby.
Berwick and Durham Roads Act 1793 (repealed)	33 Geo. 3. c. 185	7 June 1793
An Act for repairing and widening that Part of the Road leading from Kelso towards the Town of Selkirk, which lies to the Eastward of the Turnpike Road leading from Jedburgh to Lauder, which crosses the River Tiviot, near the Town of Kelso, and the Road leading from Kelso towards Coldstream, to the Place where it joins the Turnpike Road leading from Greenlaw to Coldstream, and from Kelso through Ednam, to Orange Lane, in the Parish of Eccles, in the County of Berwick, and from the Ford at Newton Mill, through Ednam to Edenfoot, and from Kelso to Cornhill, in the County of Durham. (Repealed by Roads in Roxburgh Act 1815 (55 Geo. 3. c. xvii))

=== Private and personal acts ===
Short title	Citation	Royal assent
Long title
Bempdé's Name Act 1793	33 Geo. 3. c. 1 Pr.	28 February 1793
An Act to enable Richard Johnstone Vanden Bempdé Esquire, (lately called Richard Bempdé Johnstone,) and the Heirs Male of His Body, to take the Surname, and bear the Arms of Vanden Bempdé only, pursuant to the Will of John Vanden Bempdé Esquire, deceased.
Hansen's Naturalization Act 1793	33 Geo. 3. c. 2 Pr.	28 February 1793
An Act for naturalizing Peter Peterson Hansen, and Otto Hinrick Hansen.
Fisher's Naturalization Act 1793	33 Geo. 3. c. 3 Pr.	28 February 1793
An Act for naturalizing John William Fisher.
Ladbroke's Estate Act 1793	33 Geo. 3. c. 4 Pr.	6 March 1793
An Act for vesting certain Estates of Robert Ladbroke Esquire, in the Counties of Warwick and Northampton, in Trustees, to be sold, and for laying out the Monies to arise thereby in the Purchase of other Manors, Lands, and Hereditaments, to be settled to the same Uses as the said settled Estates now stand limited.
Vallotton's Naturalization Act 1793	33 Geo. 3. c. 5 Pr.	6 March 1793
An Act for naturalizing John James Vallotton.
Risely Inclosure Act 1793	33 Geo. 3. c. 6 Pr.	28 March 1793
An Act for dividing and enclosing the Common and Open Fields, Meadows, Commonable Lands, and Waste Grounds, within the Parish of Riseley, in the County of Bedford.
Dunsley Moor in Whitby (Yorkshire, North Riding) Inclosure Act 1793	33 Geo. 3. c. 7 Pr.	28 March 1793
An Act for dividing and enclosing the Common, or Parcel of Waste Land, called Dunsley Moor, within the Township of Newholm-cum-Dunsley, in the Parish of Whitby, in the North Riding of the County of York.
Dunston Inclosure Act 1793	33 Geo. 3. c. 8 Pr.	28 March 1793
An Act for dividing and enclosing the Open and Common Fields and Heath, Common Pasture, and Waste Lands in the Parish of Dunston, in the County of Lincoln.
South Milforth and Lumby (Yorkshire, West Riding) Inclosure Act 1793	33 Geo. 3. c. 9 Pr.	28 March 1793
An Act for dividing and enclosing the Open Parts of the Common Fields, Commons, and Waste Grounds within the Townships or Hamlets of South Milforth and Lumby, in the Parish of Sherburn, in the West Riding of the County of York.
Wadenhoe Inclosure Act 1793	33 Geo. 3. c. 10 Pr.	28 March 1793
An Act for dividing and enclosing the Common and Open Fields, Meadows, Commonable Lands, and Waste Grounds, in the Parish of Wadenhoe, in the County of Northampton.
Wakefield Inclosure Act 1793	33 Geo. 3. c. 11 Pr.	28 March 1793
An Act for dividing and enclosing the Open Common Fields, Ings, Commons, and Waste Grounds within the Townships or Graveships of Wakefield, Stanley, Wrenthorpe, Alverthorpe, and Thornes, in the Parish of Wakefield, in the West Riding of the County of York.
Chatteris Inclosure Act 1793	33 Geo. 3. c. 12 Pr.	28 March 1793
An Act for the better ordering and regulating the Manner of feeding, using, cultivating, and enjoying several Commonable and Waste Grounds lying in Chatteris, in the Isle of Ely, in the County of Cambridge; and for obliging the Occupiers of certain Parts of the said Grounds to fence the same, and for holding in Severalty, for ever, certain Parts or Lots, being Part of the said Grounds called The Acre Fen, and Little Ferry Burrows, in the said Parish of Chatteris.
Milton in Kewstoke (Somerset) Inclosure Act 1793	33 Geo. 3. c. 13 Pr.	28 March 1793
An Act for dividing, allotting, and enclosing a certain Moor or Common within the Manor of Milton, in the Parish of Kewstoke, in the County of Somerset.
Barton-upon-Humber Inclosure Act 1793	33 Geo. 3. c. 14 Pr.	28 March 1793
An Act for dividing, allotting, and enclosing the Open Fields, Ings, Marshes, and Common Pastures, and other Common and Waste Lands and Grounds within the Lordship of Barton-upon-Humber, in the County of Lincoln.
Grauby and Sutton (Nottinghamshire) Inclosure Act 1793	33 Geo. 3. c. 15 Pr.	28 March 1793
An Act for dividing and enclosing the Open Common Fields, Meadows, and Pastures, and other Commonable Lands and Waste Grounds within the Liberties of Granby and Sutton, in the Parish of Granby and Sutton, in the County of Nottingham.
Stewart's Divorce Act 1793	33 Geo. 3. c. 16 Pr.	28 March 1793
An Act to dissolve the Marriage of Alexander Stewart Esquire, with Elizabeth Leigh, his now Wife, and to enable him to marry again; and for other Purposes therein mentioned.
Butcher's Name Act 1793	33 Geo. 3. c. 17 Pr.	28 March 1793
An Act to enable John Butcher Esquire, and his Issue, to use the Surname and Arms of Rodbard, pursuant to the Will of Henry Rodbard Esquire.
Naturalization of Charles Francis and Charles John Dunmergue Act 1793	33 Geo. 3. c. 18 Pr.	28 March 1793
An Act for naturalizing Charles Francis Dumergue and Charles John Joli Dumergue.
Robin's Naturalization Act 1793	33 Geo. 3. c. 19 Pr.	28 March 1793
An Act for naturalizing Peter Lewis Robin.
Naturalization of François Moré, Philip Colomb, Louys Gruaz and John Amick Act 1793	33 Geo. 3. c. 20 Pr.	28 March 1793
An Act for naturalizing Francois Moré, Philip Colomb, Louys Gruaz, and John Amick.
Engell's Naturalization Act 1793	33 Geo. 3. c. 21 Pr.	28 March 1793
An Act for naturalizing Henry Engell.
Duke of Marlborough and Lincoln College, Oxford Estates Act 1793	33 Geo. 3. c. 22 Pr.	30 April 1793
An Act for establishing and confirming certain Articles of Agreement entered into between the Duke of Marlborough and Lincoln College, Oxford.
George Perrott's Estate and the River Avon Navigation Act 1793	33 Geo. 3. c. 23 Pr.	30 April 1793
An Act for vesting the Navigation of the River Avon, in the Counties of Warwick, Worcester, and Gloucester, and certain other Estates in the Counties of Worcester and Warwick, late the Property of George Perrott Esquire, deceased, in Trustees, to be sold, and the Monies arising thereby to be applied in the Purchase of other Estates to be settled to the same Uses as those directed to be sold by this Act, are now settled.
Normanton Inclosure Act 1793	33 Geo. 3. c. 24 Pr.	30 April 1793
An Act for dividing, allotting, and enclosing the Open Fields, Meadows, Pastures, and Commonable Heath Grounds within the Parish of Normanton, in the County of Rutland.
Moreton and Wilberton (Staffordshire) Inclosure Act 1793	33 Geo. 3. c. 25 Pr.	30 April 1793
An Act for dividing and enclosing certain Commons or Waste Lands within the Townships of Moreton and Wilbrighton, otherwise Wilberton, in the Parish of Gnosall, in the County of Stafford.
Covenham St. Bartholomew and Covenham St. Mary (Lincolnshire) Inclosure Act 1793	33 Geo. 3. c. 26 Pr.	30 April 1793
An Act for dividing and enclosing the Open and Common Fields, Meadows, Common Fens, and other Commonable Lands and Waste Grounds, in the several Parishes of Covenham Saint Bartholomew, and Covenham Saint Mary, in the County of Lincoln.
Stoke Lyne and Fewcott (Oxfordshire) Inclosure Act 1793	33 Geo. 3. c. 27 Pr.	30 April 1793
An Act for dividing and enclosing the Open and Common Fields, Common Meadows, Common Pastures, Commons, Waste and other Commonable Lands or Grounds, within the Liberties and Precincts of Stoke Lyne and Fewcott, in the Parish of Stoke Lyne, in the County of Oxford.
Adderbury Inclosure Act 1793	33 Geo. 3. c. 28 Pr.	30 April 1793
An Act for dividing and enclosing the Open and Common Fields, Common Meadows, Common Pastures, Common Grounds, and Commonable Lands, within the Manor, Township, Liberty, and Precincts of Little Barford, otherwise Barford Saint John, in the Parish of Adderbury, in the County of Oxford.
Dunstew Inclosure Act 1793	33 Geo. 3. c. 29 Pr.	30 April 1793
An Act for dividing and enclosing the Open and Common Fields, Common Meadows, Common Pastures, Common Grounds, and Commonable Lands, within the Manor and Parish of Dunstew, in the County of Oxford.
Marham Inclosure Act 1793	33 Geo. 3. c. 30 Pr.	30 April 1793
An Act for dividing, allotting, and enclosing the Old Whole Year Lands, Common Fields, Half Year Lands, Lammas Meadows, Heaths, Commons, and Waste Lands, within the Parish of Marham, in the County of Norfolk.
St. Cuthbert in Wells (Somerset) Inclosure Act 1793	33 Geo. 3. c. 31 Pr.	30 April 1793
An Act for dividing, enclosing, and allotting certain Moors, Commons or Waste Lands, lying and being within the Out-Parish of Saint Cuthbert, in Wells, in the County of Somerset.
Castlethorpe Inclosure Act 1793	33 Geo. 3. c. 32 Pr.	30 April 1793
An Act for dividing, and enclosing the Open and Common Fields, and other Commonable Lands, within the Parish of Castlethorpe, in the County of Buckingham.
Stiffkey and Morston (Norfolk) Inclosure Act 1793	33 Geo. 3. c. 33 Pr.	30 April 1793
An Act for dividing, allotting, and enclosing certain Open and Common Fields, Half Year Lands, Commons, Commonable Lands and Waste Grounds, within the Parishes of Stiffkey and Morston, in the County of Norfolk, and for extinguishing all Rights of Common, Sheep Walk, and Shackage, in, over and upon all the Lands and Grounds within the said Parishes.
Street's Divorce Act 1793	33 Geo. 3. c. 34 Pr.	30 April 1793
An Act to dissolve the Marriage of John Street Gentleman, with Lucy Duncumb his now Wife, and to enable him to marry again, and for other Purposes therein mentioned.
Naturalization of John Wiss and John Charretié Act 1793	33 Geo. 3. c. 35 Pr.	30 April 1793
An Act for naturalizing John Anthony Wiss, and John Isaac Charretié.
Naturalization of Emanuel Muller and John Rapp Act 1793	33 Geo. 3. c. 36 Pr.	30 April 1793
An Act for naturalizing Emanuel Muller, and John Rapp.
Benezech's Naturalization Act 1793	33 Geo. 3. c. 37 Pr.	30 April 1793
An Act for naturalizing Peter Benezech.
Herschel's Naturalization Act 1793	33 Geo. 3. c. 38 Pr.	30 April 1793
An Act for naturalizing William Herschel.
Anderson's Naturalization Act 1793	33 Geo. 3. c. 39 Pr.	30 April 1793
An Act for naturalizing Carsten Anderson.
Lightwood in Normacott (Staffordshire) Inclosure Act 1793	33 Geo. 3. c. 40 Pr.	7 May 1793
An Act for dividing, allotting and enclosing the Common or Waste Ground called Lightwood, within the Township of Normacott, in the Parish of Stone, in the County of Stafford.
Milton Bryant Inclosure Act 1793	33 Geo. 3. c. 41 Pr.	7 May 1793
An Act for dividing and enclosing the Open and Common Fields and Meadows, Common Pastures and other Commonable Lands and Grounds, within the Parish of Milton Bryant, in the County of Bedford.
Greetham Inclosure Act 1793	33 Geo. 3. c. 42 Pr.	10 May 1793
An Act for dividing and enclosing the Open and Common Fields, Common Pastures, and other Commonable and Waste Lands, in the Parish of Greetham, in the County of Lincoln.
Durnford Inclosure Act 1793	33 Geo. 3. c. 43 Pr.	10 May 1793
An Act for dividing and allotting certain Open and Common Fields, Downs and other Commonable Lands and Grounds, in the Parish of Durnford, in the County of Wilts.
Shifnal Inclosure Act 1793	33 Geo. 3. c. 44 Pr.	10 May 1793
An Act for dividing, allotting, and enclosing five Open Common Fields, commonly called Shiffnal Town Field, otherwise Pool Field, otherwise Drayton Field, the Wyke Field, the Church Field, otherwise Haughton Field, Haughton Middle Field, otherwise Patnal Field, and the Upper Field, otherwise Nedge Field, in the Parish of Idsal, otherwise Shiffnal, in the County of Salop.
Bicester Inclosure Act 1793	33 Geo. 3. c. 45 Pr.	10 May 1793
An Act for dividing and enclosing the Open and Common Arable Meadow, Ley Pasture, and Waste Lands, lying and being within the Township of Burcester-King's-End, otherwise Bicester-King's End, in the Parish of Burcester, otherwise Bicester, in the County of Oxford.
Aston Upthorpe Inclosure Act 1793	33 Geo. 3. c. 46 Pr.	10 May 1793
An Act for dividing and enclosing the Open Common Fields, Common Meadows, Common Pastures, Downs, Waste Grounds, and Commonable Places, within the Hamlet of Aston Upthorpe, in the Parish of Blewbury, in the County of Berks.
Kirton in Lindsey Inclosure Act 1793	33 Geo. 3. c. 47 Pr.	10 May 1793
An Act for dividing and enclosing the Open Common Fields, Meadows, Pastures, and other Commonable Lands and Waste Grounds, in the Lordship of Kirton-in-Lindsey, in the County of Lincoln.
Glanville's Estate Act 1793	33 Geo. 3. c. 48 Pr.	3 June 1793
An Act for vesting the settled Estates of Francis Glanville Esquire, in the County of Wilts, in Trustees, to be sold, and for laying out the Money arising by such Sale in Lands and Hereditaments, to be settled in Lieu thereof.
Disuniting Gimingham and Trunch Rectories (Norfolk) Act 1793	33 Geo. 3. c. 49 Pr.	3 June 1793
An Act to disunite the Rectories of Gimmingham and Trunch, in the County of Norfolk, and Diocese of Norwich.
Dickenson's Estate Act 1793	33 Geo. 3. c. 50 Pr.	3 June 1793
An Act to empower William Churchill Dickenson Esquire to grant building Leases, renewable Leases, and make Conveyances in Fee, of and upon all or any Part of the Estates at Chorlton Row, devised by the Will of John Dickenson Esquire, deceased, situate near the Town of Manchester, in the County Palatine of Lancaster.
Gartside's Estate Act 1793	33 Geo. 3. c. 51 Pr.	3 June 1793
An Act to enable John Gartside Esquire to grant and convey the Inheritance, in Fee Simple, for building upon reserving Rents, or to make Building Leases, of any Part of his settled Estate in Little Bolton, in the County of Lancaster.
Greene's Estate Act 1793	33 Geo. 3. c. 52 Pr.	3 June 1793
An Act to enable Mary Greene, Widow, and James Greene Esquire, her Son, and the Survivor of them, to grant and convey, in Fee Farm, for the Purposes of Building, or to make building Leases, for any Term of Years, of Messuages and Lands at Droylsden, Failsworth, and Newton, in the County of Lancaster.
Wisbech Saint Peter's Castle Act 1793	33 Geo. 3. c. 53 Pr.	3 June 1793
An Act to enable the Lord Bishop of Ely to sell the Castle of Wisbech Saint Peter's, in the Isle of Ely, in the County of Cambridge, and the Gardens and Appurtenances thereunto belonging, and for applying the Money to arise from such Sale in Manner therein mentioned.
Newnham's Estate Act 1793	33 Geo. 3. c. 54 Pr.	3 June 1793
An Act for vesting the Inheritance, in Fee Simple, of Part of the settled Estates of John Newnham Esquire, in John Trayton Fuller Esquire.
Knight's Estate Act 1793	33 Geo. 3. c. 55 Pr.	3 June 1793
An Act for vesting certain Estates in Wiltshire, Somersetshire, and Gloucestershire, in Trustees, to the Uses of the Will of Jacob Knight Esquire, deceased, in Lieu of an Estate in Worcestershire, limited to such Uses by the said Will; and for vesting the Estate in Worcestershire in Warren Hastings Esquire, in Fee Simple.
Smith's and Amherst's Estates Act 1793	33 Geo. 3. c. 56 Pr.	3 June 1793
An Act for enabling the Trustees of Henry Smith Esquire, deceased, to accept a Grant of a Rent Charge, or clear annual Payment or Sum of Twenty Pounds, to be charged upon, and paid, and payable at Michaelmas in every Year by and out of a Messuage, Farm, and Lands, of the Right Honourable Jeffery Lord Amherst, in the Parish of Horley, in the County of Surrey, in exchange for several Pieces or Parcels of Land, situate, lying, and being in Seven Oaks, in the County of Kent, enclosed from the Waste of the Manors of Seven Oaks and Knowle, or one of them, and to convey the said several Pieces or Parcels of Land to the said Jeffery Lord Amherst, and his Heirs accordingly.
Canterbury Cathedral Estate Act 1793	33 Geo. 3. c. 57 Pr.	3 June 1793
An Act for enabling the Dean and Chapter of Canterbury to grant building Leases to Mr. Francis Hurlbatt.
Trafford Estate Act 1793	33 Geo. 3. c. 58 Pr.	3 June 1793
An Act to enable John Trafford Esquire, and other Persons after his Death, to grant Leases of the Estates devised by the Will of the late Humphrey Trafford Esquire, situate in the Counties of Lancaster and Chester, for building; and also to grant Leases of certain Waste Moss Lands, in the said Counties, other Parts of the said devised Estates.
Blackburne and Kent Estate Act 1793	33 Geo. 3. c. 59 Pr.	3 June 1793
An Act for Sale of a Leasehold Estate, late of John Blackburne Esquire, deceased; and of a Freehold and Leasehold Estate, late of Richard Kent Esquire, deceased; and for the Application of the respective Purchase Monies.
Shotteswell Inclosure Act 1793	33 Geo. 3. c. 60 Pr.	3 June 1793
An Act for dividing and enclosing the Open and Common Fields, and Common or Commonable Meadows, Pastures, Lands and Grounds, and Common or Waste Land, in the Parish of Shotteswell, in the County of Warwick.
Armley Inclosure Act 1793	33 Geo. 3. c. 61 Pr.	3 June 1793
An Act for dividing and enclosing the Common and Waste Grounds within the Manor or Township of Armley, in the Parish of Leeds, in the West Riding of the County of York.
Thorngrafton Inclosure Act 1793	33 Geo. 3. c. 62 Pr.	3 June 1793
An Act for dividing, allotting, and enclosing a certain Common Moor, or Tract of Waste Ground, called Thorngrafton Common, and also certain Common Fields or Dales, and Pieces of Land, within the Township of Thorngrafton, all within the Barony or Manor of Wark, and in the Parish of Haltwhistle, in the County of Northumberland.
Langley South Common Inclosure Act 1793	33 Geo. 3. c. 63 Pr.	3 June 1793
An Act for dividing, allotting, and enclosing a certain Common Moor, or Tract of Waste Ground, called Langley South Common, within the Barony or Manor of Langley, and in the Parish of Warden, in the County of Northumberland.
Grindon Common Inclosure Act 1793	33 Geo. 3. c. 64 Pr.	3 June 1793
An Act for dividing, allotting, and enclosing a certain Common Moor, or Tract of Waste Ground, called Grindon Common, within the Barony or Manor of Langley, and in the Parish of Warden, in the County of Northumberland.
Allington Inclosure Act 1793	33 Geo. 3. c. 65 Pr.	3 June 1793
An Act for dividing and enclosing the Open Arable Fields, and other un-enclosed Lands within the Manor or Manors of Allington, in the County of Lincoln.
Aldsworth Inclosure Act 1793	33 Geo. 3. c. 66 Pr.	3 June 1793
An Act for dividing and enclosing the Open and Common Fields, Downs, Common Pastures, and other Commonable Places, within the Manor and Parish of Aldsworth, in the County of Gloucester.
Orston and Thoroton (Nottinghamshire) Inclosure Act 1793	33 Geo. 3. c. 67 Pr.	3 June 1793
An Act for dividing and inclosing the Open Arable Fields, Pastures, Meadows, Commons, and Waste Grounds within the Townships of Orston and Thoroton, in the Parish of Orston, in the County of Nottingham.
Maisemore Inclosure Act 1793	33 Geo. 3. c. 68 Pr.	3 June 1793
An Act for dividing and enclosing the Open and Common Fields, Common Meadows, Common Pastures, Waste, and other Commonable Lands, within the Parish of Maisemore, in the County of Gloucester (except a certain Meadow called Maisemore Ham), and for rendering all the Lands and Tenements within the said Parish wholly exempt and discharged from Tythe and all Modus and Composition for Tythe, by allotting Lands in lieu thereof.
Cobham Inclosure Act 1793	33 Geo. 3. c. 69 Pr.	3 June 1793
An Act for dividing and enclosing the several Commons, Heaths, and Marsh and Waste Lands within the Manor of Cobham, otherwise Coveham, in the Parish of Cobham, in the County of Surrey.
Masham and Mashamshire (Yorkshire, North Riding) Inclosure Act 1793	33 Geo. 3. c. 70 Pr.	3 June 1793
An Act for dividing and enclosing Part of the Moors and Wastes within the Manor of Masham and Mashamshire, in the North Riding of the County of York.
Weaverham Inclosure Act 1793	33 Geo. 3. c. 71 Pr.	3 June 1793
An Act for dividing, allotting, and enclosing certain Commons or Waste Lands within the Town, Manor, or Lordship of Weaverham, in the County of Chester.
Little Tew Inclosure Act 1793	33 Geo. 3. c. 72 Pr.	3 June 1793
An Act for dividing and enclosing the Open and Common Field, and other Commonable Lands and Grounds lying within the Hamlet and Liberties of Little Tew, in the County of Oxford.
Moulton Inclosure Act 1793	33 Geo. 3. c. 73 Pr.	3 June 1793
An Act for dividing and enclosing the Commonable Salt Marshes, Droves, Commons, and Waste Lands within the Parish of Moulton, in the County of Lincoln.
Milcomb Inclosure Act 1793	33 Geo. 3. c. 74 Pr.	3 June 1793
An Act for dividing and enclosing the Open and Common Field, and other Commonable Lands and Grounds, lying within the Hamlet and Liberties of Milcomb, in the County of Oxford.
Martin's Divorce Act 1793	33 Geo. 3. c. 75 Pr.	3 June 1793
An Act to Dissolve the Marriage of Richard Martin Esquire, with Elizabeth Vesey, his now Wife, and to enable him to marry again, and for other Purposes therein mentioned.
Zernitz's Naturalization Act 1793	33 Geo. 3. c. 76 Pr.	3 June 1793
An Act for Naturalizing Frederic Cyriac Zernitz.
Berguer's Naturalization Act 1793	33 Geo. 3. c. 77 Pr.	3 June 1793
An Act for Naturalizing David Berguer.
Boccius's Naturalization Act 1793	33 Geo. 3. c. 78 Pr.	3 June 1793
An Act for Naturalizing Frederick Gottlieb Boccius.
Duchess of Chandos's Estate Act 1793	33 Geo. 3. c. 79 Pr.	7 June 1793
An Act for empowering the Committees or Committee, for the Time being, of the Estate of the Most Noble Anna Eliza Duchess of Chandos, a Lunatic, to make Leases of her Estate during her Lunacy and for other Purposes therein mentioned.
Darby's and St. John's Estates Act 1793	33 Geo. 3. c. 80 Pr.	7 June 1793
An Act for confirming and rendering effectual a Partition and Division between William Thomas Darby Esquire, and Saint Andrew Saint John Esquire, of divers Manors, Lands, and Hereditaments (heretofore the Estate of Richard Jackson Esquire, deceased) in the several Counties of Norfolk, Essex, Surrey, Middlesex, and the City of London, and for limiting and settling the specific Parts thereof, which, upon such Partition and Division, were allotted to each of them, to the several Uses therein mentioned.
Bridgeman Estate Act 1793	33 Geo. 3. c. 81 Pr.	7 June 1793
An Act to enable Sir Henry Bridgeman, Baronet, and, after his Death, other Persons, to grant Building Leases of his settled Estates, at or near Bolton-in-le-Moors, in the County of Lancaster, for long Terms of Years.
Lever Estate Act 1793	33 Geo. 3. c. 82 Pr.	7 June 1793
An Act to enable James Lever, of Hindley, in the County of Lancaster Esquire, to make Grants in Fee, and also to grant Building Leases of certain Estates in the Township of Bolton-le-Moors, in the said County.
Willoughby on the Wolds (Nottinghamshire) Inclosure Act 1793	33 Geo. 3. c. 83 Pr.	7 June 1793
An Act for dividing and enclosing the Open Fields, Meadows, and Pastures, within the Parish of Willoughby on the Wolds, in the County of Nottingham.
Queneborough Inclosure Act 1793	33 Geo. 3. c. 84 Pr.	7 June 1793
An Act for dividing, allotting and enclosing the Open Fields, Meadows, and Commonable Grounds in the Parish or Lordship of Queneborough, in the County of Leicester.
Taddington and Priestcliff (Derbyshire) Inclosure Act 1793	33 Geo. 3. c. 85 Pr.	7 June 1793
An Act for dividing and enclosing the several Open Fields, Meadows, Pastures, Commons, and Waste Grounds, within the Hamlet of Taddington and Priestcliff, in the Parish of Blakewell, and County of Derby.
Brown's Divorce Act 1793	33 Geo. 3. c. 86 Pr.	7 June 1793
An Act to dissolve the Marriage of Edward Brown Esquire, with Susannah Solley his now Wife, and to enable him to marry again; and for other Purposes therein mentioned.
Bewicke's Divorce Act 1793	33 Geo. 3. c. 87 Pr.	7 June 1793
An Act to dissolve the Marriage of the Reverend Calverley John Bewicke Clerk, with Mary Elizabeth, otherwise Mary Eliza Vaughan, his now Wife, and to enable him to marry again; and for other Purposes therein mentioned.
Duke of Norfolk's and Francis Foljambe's estates: enabling an infant trustee, Richard Vyse, to join in making an exchange.	33 Geo. 3. c. 88 Pr.	11 June 1793
An Act for enabling Richard William Howard Vyse, an infant Trustee, to join in making an Exchange of Part of the Estate of the Most Noble Charles Duke of Norfolk, with Francis Ferrand Foljambe Esquire.
Brotherton Inclosure Act 1793	33 Geo. 3. c. 89 Pr.	11 June 1793
An Act for dividing, enclosing, stinting, regulating, and otherwise improving certain Lands and Grounds in the Parish of Brotherton, in the West Riding of the County of York.
Swindon (Staffordshire) Inclosure Act 1793	33 Geo. 3. c. 90 Pr.	11 June 1793
An Act for dividing and enclosing certain Commons and Waste Lands within the Manor and Liberty of Swindon, in the Parish of Womborne, in the County of Stafford.
Knottingley Inclosure Act 1793	33 Geo. 3. c. 91 Pr.	11 June 1793
An Act for dividing and enclosing the Commons and Waste Grounds, and Ings or Meadow Grounds within the Township of Knottingley, in the West Riding of the County of York.
Llanferres and Kilken (Flintshire) Inclosure Act 1793	33 Geo. 3. c. 92 Pr.	11 June 1793
An Act for dividing, allotting, and enclosing certain Common and Waste Lands in the Parishes of Llanferres, in the County of Denbigh, and Kilken, in the County of Flint.
Frodsham and Helsby (Cheshire) Inclosure Act 1793	33 Geo. 3. c. 93 Pr.	11 June 1793
An Act for dividing, allotting, and enclosing certain Commons and Waste Lands within the Town and Lordship of Frodsham, and the Township of Helsby, in the Parish of Frodsham, in the County of Chester.
Valle's Naturalization Act 1793	33 Geo. 3. c. 94 Pr.	11 June 1793
An Act for naturalizing Bartholomew Valle.
Dean and Chapter of Lincoln's and Richard Ellison's estates: exchange.	33 Geo. 3. c. 95 Pr.	17 June 1793
An Act for effectuating an Exchange between the Dean and Chapter of Lincoln, and Richard Ellison Esquire.
John Heaton's Estate Act 1793	33 Geo. 3. c. 96 Pr.	17 June 1793
An Act to enable Sarah Heaton, Widow, Mother and Guardian of John Heaton, a Minor, to grant building Leases, during his Minority, of Ground in the Parish of Saint Pancras, in the County of Middlesex.
Speeton (Yorkshire, East Riding) Inclosure Act 1793	33 Geo. 3. c. 97 Pr.	17 June 1793
An Act for dividing and enclosing the Open Fields, Lands, Pastures, and Wastes, within the Township of Speeton, in the Parish of Bridlington, in the East Riding of the County of York.
Southburn (Yorkshire, East Riding) Inclosure Act 1793	33 Geo. 3. c. 98 Pr.	17 June 1793
An Act for dividing, enclosing, and improving the Open Fields, Meadows, Pastures, and Wastes, within the Township of Southburn, in the Parish of Kirkburn, in the East Riding of the County of York.
Thirsk, Bagby, and Balk (Yorkshire, North Riding) Inclosure Act 1793	33 Geo. 3. c. 99 Pr.	17 June 1793
An Act for dividing and enclosing a certain Moor or Common, called Thirsk West Moor, and Carlton and Sandhutton Commons, in the Parish of Thirsk, in the North Riding of the County of York, and several Parcels of Moor or Common Land, being part of Bagby High Moor lying within the several Townships of Thirsk, Bagby, and Balk, in the said Riding.
Slawston Inclosure Act 1793	33 Geo. 3. c. 100 Pr.	17 June 1793
An Act for dividing and enclosing the Open and Common Fields, Meadows, Common Pastures, and other Commonable and Waste Lands and Grounds in the Parish of Slawston, in the County of Leicester.
Thornborough Moor Inclosure Act 1793	33 Geo. 3. c. 101 Pr.	17 June 1793
An Act for dividing and enclosing the Open Common Fields, and a certain Moor or Common called Thornborough Moor, within the Parish of West Tanfield, in the North Riding of the County of York.
Skidby Inclosure Act 1793	33 Geo. 3. c. 102 Pr.	21 June 1793
An Act for dividing and enclosing the Open and unenclosed Fields, and Arable, Meadow, and Pasture Lands, Pastures, and Wastes, within the Township of Skidby, in the Parish of Skidby, in the East Riding of the County of York.
Hollym and Withernsea (Yorkshire, East Riding) Inclosure Act 1793	33 Geo. 3. c. 103 Pr.	21 June 1793
An Act for dividing and enclosing the Open Fields, Meadows, Pastures, and Carrs, within the several Townships of Hollym and Withernsea, in the Parish of Hollym, in the East Riding of the County of York, and for making a Compensation in lieu of the Tythes thereof, and also of the Tythes of the ancient enclosed Lands in the said Townships.
Treijer's Naturalization Act 1793	33 Geo. 3. c. 104 Pr.	21 June 1793
An Act for naturalizing Gotlieb Augustus Treijer.

=== Sources ===
- Pickering, Danby, ed. (1794). "Anno regni tricesimo tertio Georgii III". The Statutes at Large. Vol. 39. pp. 1–366 – via Google Books.
- Journals of the House of Commons. Vol. 48. London: His Majesty's Stationery Office. 1803. pp. 3–997 – via Google Books.
- Journal of the House of Lords. Vol. 39: 1790-1793. pp. 492–773 – via British History Online.
- Chronological Table of and Index to the Statutes. Vol. 1: To the End of the Session 59 Vict. Sess. 2 (1895) (13th ed.). London: Her Majesty's Stationery Office. 1896. pp. 152–154 – via Google Books.
- "Acts of the Parliament of Great Britain from 1793". legislation.gov.uk. The National Archives.

== See also ==
- List of acts of the Parliament of Great Britain
