= Moortown, Lincolnshire =

Hamlet in Lincolnshire, England

Coordinates: 53.478595°N 0.387°W

Moortown
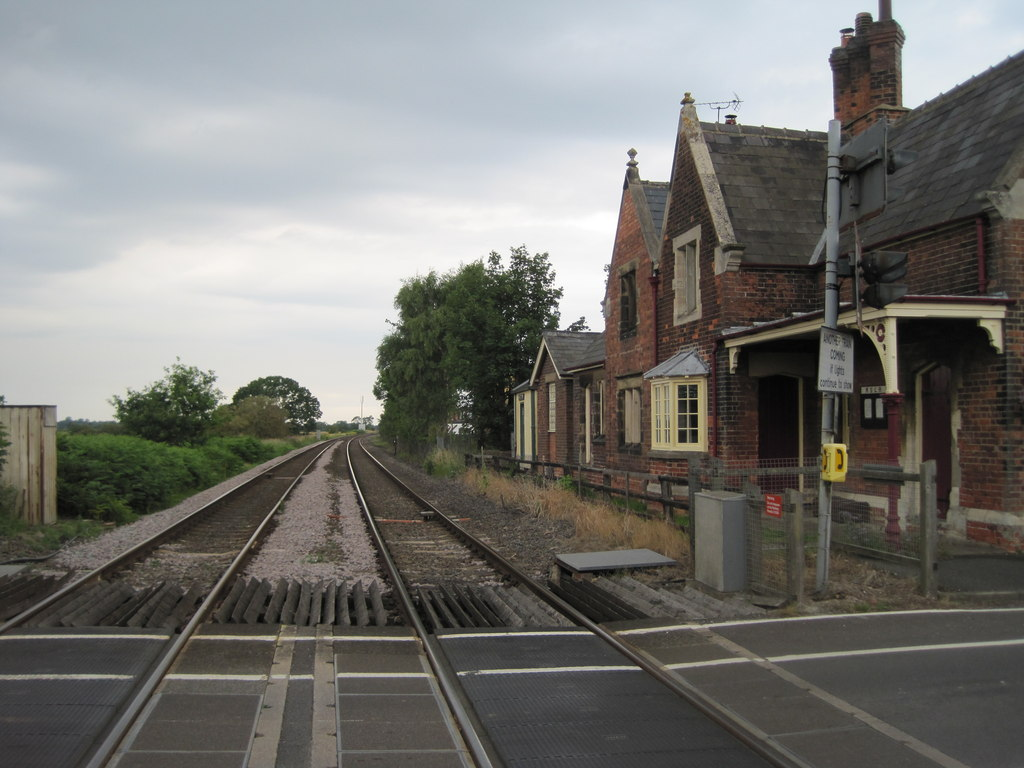
- Moortown railway station

- Location within Lincolnshire
- OS grid reference: TF071991
  - London: 140 mi (230 km) S
- Civil parish: South Kelsey
- District: West Lindsey
- Shire county: Lincolnshire
- Region: East Midlands
- Country: England
- Sovereign state: United Kingdom
- Post town: Market Rasen
- Postcode district: LN7
- Police: Lincolnshire
- Fire: Lincolnshire
- Ambulance: East Midlands
- UK Parliament: Gainsborough

Moortown is a hamlet in the civil parish of South Kelsey, and in the West Lindsey district of Lincolnshire, England. It is at the crossroads of the B1205 and B1434 roads, 3 miles (5 km) south-west from Caistor, 7 miles (11 km) south-east from Brigg and 14 miles (23 km) west from Grimsby.

The nearest primary school is in North Kelsey and the nearest secondary schools are in Caistor. Moortown has a public house, The Skipworth Arms, a campsite, bus shelter, and a letterbox.

Previously there was a Victorian railway station (opposite the Skipworth Arms) from which trains to Lincoln and Grimsby ran. There are weekday bus services to Brigg and Scunthorpe.

== Golden Jubilee ==
In 2002 village residents marked the Golden Jubilee of Elizabeth II. There was a Jubilee Day event and a permanent memorial constructed, the latter a decorative sign with brass plaque adjacent to an existing Silver Jubilee bench.
