= Liverpool pound =

Local currencies in Liverpool, England

The Liverpool pound refers to various types of local currencies used in Liverpool, United Kingdom.

== History ==
Liverpool Note Issue Act 1793
- Act of Parliament
- Parliament of Great Britain
- Long title: An Act to enable the Common Council of the Town of Liverpool in the County of Lancaster, on Behalf and Account of the Corporation of the said Town, to issue Negotiable Notes, for a limited Time, and to a limited Amount.
- Citation: 33 Geo. 3. c. 31
- Territorial extent: Great Britain

Dates
- Royal assent: 10 May 1793
- Commencement: 25 May 1793 (Note: Section 1.)
- Expired: 25 October 1795 (Note: Section 1.)
- Repealed: 30 July 1948

Other legislation
- Repealed by: Statute Law Revision Act 1948

Status: Repealed

Text of statute as originally enacted

Between 1793 and 1796, in order to solve a local financial crisis the Liverpool Corporation gained permission from the House of Commons to distribute its own banknotes in denominations of £50 and £100. Today versions of the original notes are displayed at the Liverpool Museum.

In 2017 Israeli technology company Colu launched the Liverpool Local Pound, a digital currency accessible through a smartphone app and which offers discounts at businesses in Liverpool.
