= South Kelsey =

Village and civil parish in the West Lindsey district of Lincolnshire, England

Coordinates: 53.470240°N 0.432107°W

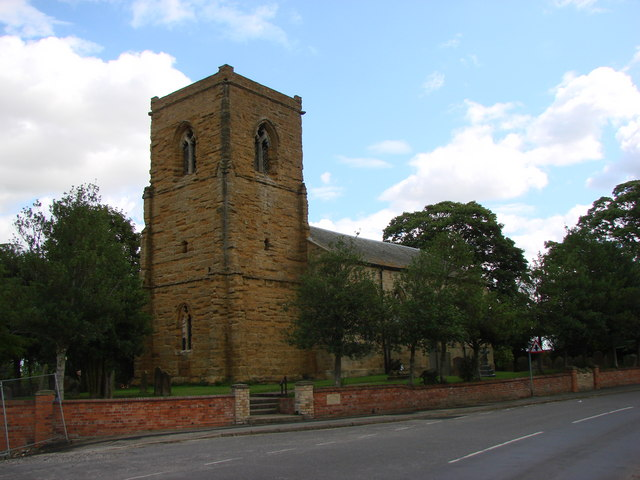
- St Mary's Church, South Kelsey

- Location within Lincolnshire
- Population: 604 (2011)
- OS grid reference: TF041982
  - London: 140 mi (230 km) S
- District: West Lindsey
- Shire county: Lincolnshire
- Region: East Midlands
- Country: England
- Sovereign state: United Kingdom
- Post town: Market Rasen
- Postcode district: LN7
- Police: Lincolnshire
- Fire: Lincolnshire
- Ambulance: East Midlands
- UK Parliament: Gainsborough

South Kelsey is a village and civil parish in the West Lindsey district of Lincolnshire, England. It is situated on the B1205, 5 miles (8.0 km) east from the A15 and 4.5 miles (7 km) south-west from Caistor.

According to the 2001 Census the village had a population of 571, increasing to 604 at the 2011 census.

South Kelsey has an Anglican church, St. Mary's and a village hall.
