= Jurors (Scotland) Act 1745 =

Act of the Parliament of Great Britain

Jurors (Scotland) Act 1745 (Note: The citation of this act by this short title was authorised by section 1 of, and the first schedule to, the Short Titles Act 1896. Due to the repeal of those provisions it is now authorised by section 19(2) of the Interpretation Act 1978)
- Act of Parliament
- Parliament of Great Britain
- Long title: An Act for the more easy and speedy Trial of such Persons as have levied, or shall levy War against His Majesty; and for the better ascertaining the Qualifications of Jurors in Trials for High Treason or Misprision of Treason, in that Part of Great Britain called Scotland.
- Citation: 19 Geo. 2. c. 9
- Territorial extent: Scotland (Note: Section 1.)

Dates
- Royal assent: 19 March 1746
- Commencement: 17 October 1745 (Note: Start of session.)
- Repealed: 15 June 1945
Other legislation
Amended by	Treason, etc. Act 1759; Statute Law Revision Act 1887
Repealed by	Treason Act 1945
Relates to	Habeas Corpus Suspension Act 1745; Court of Session (Scotland) Act 1745; Habeas Corpus Suspension (No. 2) Act 1745; Attainder of Earl of Kellie and Others Act 1745; Sheriffs (Scotland) Act 1747

Status: Repealed

Text of statute as originally enacted

The Jurors (Scotland) Act 1745 (19 Geo. 2. c. 9) was an act of the Parliament of Great Britain, passed during the Jacobite Rising of 1745. Its long title was "An Act for the more easy and speedy Trial of such Persons as have levied, or shall levy War against His Majesty; and for the better ascertaining the Qualifications of Jurors in Trials for High Treason or Misprision of Treason, in that Part of Great Britain called Scotland." It was one of the Juries (Scotland) Acts 1745 to 1869.

It enacted that anyone who was prosecuted for high treason could be tried anywhere in England, regardless of where they had first been indicted. Under common law a trial had to take place in the county where the crime happened. The preamble to the act explained that this change to the law was necessary because many prisoners had been moved to other prisons "for safer custody," or taken to London to be questioned, and it would have been inconvenient to transport them all back again. This exception to the rule had first been introduced as a temporary measure in 1715, during the first Jacobite Rising.

The act also changed the criteria for jury service in trials for high treason and misprision of treason committed in Scotland.

The whole act was repealed by section 2(1) of, and the schedule to, the Treason Act 1945 (8 & 9 Geo. 6. c. 44), which came into force on 15 June 1945.

== Other legislation ==
Another act in the same year, the Attainder of Earl of Kellie and Others Act 1745 (19 Geo. 2. c. 26), stated that people named in the act would automatically be attainted of treason unless they surrendered to the authorities by 12 July 1746.

== See also ==
- Habeas Corpus Suspension Act 1745
- Sheriffs (Scotland) Act 1747
- High treason in the United Kingdom
- Treason Act
