= List of acts of the Parliament of Great Britain from 1746 =

This is a complete list of acts of the Parliament of Great Britain for the year 1746.

For acts passed until 1707, see the list of acts of the Parliament of England and the list of acts of the Parliament of Scotland. See also the list of acts of the Parliament of Ireland.

For acts passed from 1801 onwards, see the list of acts of the Parliament of the United Kingdom. For acts of the devolved parliaments and assemblies in the United Kingdom, see the list of acts of the Scottish Parliament, the list of acts of the Northern Ireland Assembly, and the list of acts and measures of Senedd Cymru; see also the list of acts of the Parliament of Northern Ireland.

The number shown after each act's title is its chapter number. Acts are cited using this number, preceded by the year(s) of the reign during which the relevant parliamentary session was held; thus the Union with Ireland Act 1800 is cited as "39 & 40 Geo. 3. c. 67", meaning the 67th act passed during the session that started in the 39th year of the reign of George III and which finished in the 40th year of that reign. Note that the modern convention is to use Arabic numerals in citations (thus "41 Geo. 3" rather than "41 Geo. III").

Acts of the last session of the Parliament of Great Britain and the first session of the Parliament of the United Kingdom are both cited as "41 Geo. 3". Acts passed by the Parliament of Great Britain did not have a short title; however, some of these acts have subsequently been given a short title by acts of the Parliament of the United Kingdom (such as the Short Titles Act 1896).

Before the Acts of Parliament (Commencement) Act 1793 came into force on 8 April 1793, acts passed by the Parliament of Great Britain were deemed to have come into effect on the first day of the session in which they were passed. Because of this, the years given in the list below may in fact be the year before a particular act was passed.

== 20 Geo. 2 ==
The sixth session of the 9th Parliament of Great Britain, which met from 18 November 1746 until 17 June 1747.

This session was also traditionally cited as 20 G. 2.

=== Public acts ===
Short title	Citation	Royal assent
Long title
Habeas Corpus Suspension Act 1746 (repealed)	20 Geo. 2. c. 1	21 November 1746
An Act for the further continuing an Act made in the last Session of Parliament, intituled, "An Act to empower His Majesty to secure and detain such Persons as His Majesty shall suspect are conspiring against His Person and Government." (Note: Habeas Corpus Suspension Act 1745 (19 Geo. 2. c. 1)) (Repealed by Statute Law Revision Act 1867 (30 & 31 Vict. c. 59))
Land Tax Act 1746 (repealed)	20 Geo. 2. c. 2	23 December 1746
An Act for granting an Aid to His Majesty, by a Land Tax, to be raised in Great Britain, for the Service of the Year One Thousand Seven Hundred and Forty-seven. (Repealed by Statute Law Revision Act 1867 (30 & 31 Vict. c. 59))
National Debt Act 1746 (repealed)	20 Geo. 2. c. 3	5 February 1747
An Act for repealing the several Rates and Duties upon Houses, Windows, and Lights, and for granting to His Majesty other Rates and Duties, upon Houses, Windows, and Lights, and for raising the Sum of Four Millions Four Hundred Thousand Pounds, by Annuities, to be charged on the said Rates and Duties. (Repealed by Statute Law Revision Act 1870 (33 & 34 Vict. c. 69))
Distemper Amongst Cattle Act 1746 (repealed)	20 Geo. 2. c. 4	5 February 1747
An Act to continue, explain, and amend, an Act made in the last Session of Parliament, intituled, "An Act to enable His Majesty to make Rules, Orders, and Regulations, more effectually to prevent the spreading of the Distemper which now rages amongst the Horned Cattle in this Kingdom." (Note: Distemper Amongst Cattle Act 1745 (19 Geo. 2. c. 5)) (Repealed by Statute Law Revision Act 1867 (30 & 31 Vict. c. 59))
Taxation Act 1746 (repealed)	20 Geo. 2. c. 5	24 March 1747
An Act for continuing the Duties upon Malt, Mum, Cyder, and Perry, in that Part of Great Britain called England, and for granting to His Majesty certain Duties upon Malt, Mum, Cyder, and Perry, in that Part of Great Britain Called Scotland, and for applying a certain Sum of Money therein mentioned, towards the Supply for the Service of the Year One Thousand Seven Hundred and Forty-seven. (Repealed by Statute Law Revision Act 1867 (30 & 31 Vict. c. 59))
Berkshire Roads Act 1746 (repealed)	20 Geo. 2. c. 6	24 March 1747
An Act to continue and make more effectual Two Acts of Parliament, one passed in the Twelfth Year of the Reign of Her late Majesty Queen Anne, (Note: Berkshire Highways Act 1713 (13 Ann. c. 28)) and the other, in the First Year of the Reign of His present Majesty, (Note: Reading Roads Act 1727 (1 Geo. 2. St. 2. c. 7)) for repairing the Highways between The Bear Inn (Note: The Bear Inn, Bridge Street, Reading. 51°27′11″N 0°58′23″W) in Reading and Puntfield, (Note: Puntfield is the location of the Spring Inn, near Sulhamstead. 51°25′21″N 1°06′20″W) in the County of Berks, and for amending other Roads in the last Act mentioned. (Repealed by Berkshire Roads Act 1771 (11 Geo. 3. c. 70))
Essex Roads Act 1746 (repealed)	20 Geo. 2. c. 7	24 March 1747
An Act for enlarging the Term and Powers granted by an Act, passed in the Twelfth Year of the Reign of His late Majesty King George the First, intituled, "An Act for repairing the Roads leading from the Western Part of the Parish of Shenfield to Harwich, in the County of Essex, and the Road leading from Chelmsford, in the said County, to Sudbury, in the County of Suffolk, and from Margretting (Note: Margaretting, Essex. 51°41′22″N 0°25′00″E) to Malden, (Note: Maldon, Essex. 51°43′52″N 0°40′29″E) in the County of Essex, and from Colchester to Langham, in the same County," (Note: Essex Roads Act 1725 (12 Geo. 1. c. 23)) and for repairing other Roads adjoining to the same Roads. (Repealed by Statute Law (Repeals) Act 2008 (c. 12))
Warrington to Wigan Road Act 1746 (repealed)	20 Geo. 2. c. 8	24 March 1747
An Act for enlarging the Term and Powers granted by an Act, passed in the Thirteenth Year of the Reign of His late Majesty King George the First, (Note: Warrington and Wigan Road Act 1726 (13 Geo. 1. c. 10)) for repairing, widening, and amending, the Road leading from Warrington to Wigan, in the County of Lancaster, and also for amending and repairing the Road leading from a Place called Earl's Kill, in Warrington aforesaid, to the Toll Bars in Wallgate, in Wigan aforesaid. (Repealed by Warrington and Wigan Road Act 1813 (53 Geo. 3. c. cxxxi) (Note: Incorrectly cited as "53 Geo. 3. c. xxxi" in the Chronological Table of the Statutes.) and Warrington and Wigan Road (Lancashire) Act 1833 (3 & 4 Will. 4. c. lxxiv))
Northumberland Roads Act 1746 (repealed)	20 Geo. 2. c. 9	24 March 1747
An Act for repairing the High Road leading from the North End of The Cow Cawsey, near the Town of Newcastle upon Tyne, to the Town of Belford, and from thence to Buckton Burn, in the County of Northumberland. (Repealed by Newcastle to Carlisle Road Act 1786 (26 Geo. 3. c. 160))
National Debt (No. 2) Act 1746 (repealed)	20 Geo. 2. c. 10	24 March 1747
An Act for granting to His Majesty several Rates and Duties upon Coaches, and other Carriages therein mentioned, and for raising the Sum of One Million, by Way of Lottery, to be charged on the said Rates and Duties. (Repealed by Statute Law Revision Act 1870 (33 & 34 Vict. c. 69))
Mutiny Act 1746 (repealed)	20 Geo. 2. c. 11	24 March 1747
An Act for punishing Mutiny and Desertion, and for the better Payment of the Army and their Quarters. (Repealed by Statute Law Revision Act 1867 (30 & 31 Vict. c. 59))
Durham to Tyne Bridge Road Act 1746 (repealed)	20 Geo. 2. c. 12	24 March 1747
An Act for repairing the High Road leading from the City of Durham in the County of Durham, to Tyne Bridge, in the said County. (Repealed by Road from Durham to Tyne Bridge Act 1824 (5 Geo. 4. c. cii))
Sunderland to Durham Road Act 1746 (repealed)	20 Geo. 2. c. 13	24 March 1747
An Act for repairing the Road from Sunderland, near the Sea, to the City of Durham, in the County of Durham. (Repealed by Sunderland and Durham Road Act 1831 (1 & 2 Will. 4. c. lxiv))
Southwold Harbour Act 1746 (repealed)	20 Geo. 2. c. 14	24 March 1747
An Act for opening, cleansing, repairing, and improving, the Haven of Southwould, in the County of Suffolk. (Repealed by Southwold Harbour Act 1830 (11 Geo. 4 & 1 Will. 4. c. xlviii))
Southampton Water Supply Act 1746 (repealed)	20 Geo. 2. c. 15	17 June 1747
An Act for repairing, improving, and maintaining, the public Conduits, and other Water-works, belonging to the Town of Southampton. (Repealed by Southampton Waterworks Act 1836 (6 & 7 Will. 4. c. xcvi))
Norwich and Thetford Road Act 1746 (repealed)	20 Geo. 2. c. 16	17 June 1747
An Act for enlarging the Term and Powers granted by several Acts of Parliament, passed for repairing the Highways between Wymondham and Attleborough, and from Wymondham to Hetherset, and from the Mouth of Wigmore Lane to Hall Wolk Gate, in Attleborough, in the County of Norfolk, and for amending the other Roads adjoining to the Highways directed to be repaired by the said former Acts, and making the said Acts more effectual. (Repealed by Norwich and Thetford Road Act 1816 (56 Geo. 3. c. lxviii) and Annual Turnpike Acts Continuance Act 1869 (32 & 33 Vict. c. 90))
Dundee Beer Duties Act 1746 (repealed)	20 Geo. 2. c. 17	17 June 1747
An Act for enlarging the Term and Powers granted by Two Acts of Parliament, (Note: Dundee Beer Duties Act 1707 (c. 80 (S))) (Note: Dundee Beer Duties Act 1730 (4 Geo. 2. c. 11)) for laying a Duty of Two Penny Scots upon every Pint of Ale and Beer brewed and vended within the Town of Dundee, and the Liberties and Suburbs thereof, for the Purposes in the said Acts and this present Act mentioned. (Repealed by Statute Law Revision Act 1948 (11 & 12 Geo. 6. c. 62))
River Wear Navigation Act 1746 (repealed)	20 Geo. 2. c. 18	17 June 1747
An Act for the better Preservation and Improvement of the River Wear, and Port and Haven of Sunderland, in the County of Durham. (Repealed by River Wear and Sunderland Harbour Improvement Act 1809 (49 Geo. 3. c. xli))
Regulation of Servants and Apprentices Act 1746 (repealed)	20 Geo. 2. c. 19	17 June 1747
An Act for the better adjusting and more easy Recovery of the Wages of certain Servants, and for the better Regulation of such Servants, and of certain Apprentices. (Repealed by Conspiracy and Protection of Property Act 1875 (38 & 39 Vict. c. 86))
Title Deeds Lost by Rebellion in Scotland Act 1746 (repealed)	20 Geo. 2. c. 20	17 June 1747
An Act for the Relief of such of His Majesty's loyal Subjects, in that Part of Great Britain called Scotland, whose Title Deeds and Writings were destroyed or carried off by the Rebels in the late Rebellion. (Repealed by Statute Law Revision Act 1867 (30 & 31 Vict. c. 59))
Norwich Assizes Act 1746 (repealed)	20 Geo. 2. c. 21	17 June 1747
An Act for holding the Summer Assizes and Sessions of the Peace for the County of Norfolk in the City and County of Norwich, until a new Shire House can be built for the said County of Norfolk, and for building a new Shire-House on the Castle Hill, in the same County, and for raising Money on the said County for that Purpose. (Repealed by Statute Law Revision Act 1948 (11 & 12 Geo. 6. c. 62) (Note: Incorrectly cited as "SLR 1867" in the Chronological Table of the Statutes.))
Walton-Shepperton Bridge (Building and Tolls) Act 1746 (repealed)	20 Geo. 2. c. 22	17 June 1747
An Act for building a Bridge cross the River Thames, from the Parish of Walton upon Thames, in the County of Surrey, to Shepperton, in the County of Midd'x. (Repealed by Statute Law Revision Act 1948 (11 & 12 Geo. 6. c. 62))
Gloucester Roads Act 1746 (repealed)	20 Geo. 2. c. 23	17 June 1747
An Act for repairing the Road leading from Cirencester, in the County of Gloucester, to Birdlips Hill, in the said County. (Repealed by Cirencester Roads Act 1825 (6 Geo. 4. c. cxliii))
Naval Prize Act 1746 (repealed)	20 Geo. 2. c. 24	17 June 1747
An Act for the better securing the Payment of Shares of Prizes taken from the Enemy, to the Royal Hospital at Greenwich, and for preventing the Embezzlement of Goods and Stores belonging to the said Hospital. (Repealed by Naval Prize Acts Repeal Act 1864 (27 & 28 Vict. c. 23))
Stockton to Barnard Castle Road Act 1746 (repealed)	20 Geo. 2. c. 25	17 June 1747
An Act for repairing the High Road leading from the Town of Stockton upon Tees to Darlington, and from thence, through Winston, to Barnard Castle, in the same County. (Repealed by Stockton-upon-Tees, Darlington and Barnard Castle Road Act 1805 (45 Geo. 3. c. xvii))
Bruntisland Beer Duties Act 1746 (repealed)	20 Geo. 2. c. 26	17 June 1747
An Act for reviving and continuing an Act passed in the Sixth Year of the Reign of His late Majesty King George the First, intituled, "An Act for laying a Duty of Two Penny Scots, or One Sixth Part of a Penny Sterling, upon every Scots Pint of Beer or Ale vended or sold within the Town of Bruntisland, and Liberties thereof, for increasing the public Revenue of the said Town, and for other Purposes therein mentioned." (Note: Bruntisland Beer Duties Act 1719 (6 Geo. 1. c. 8)) (Repealed by Statute Law Revision Act 1948 (11 & 12 Geo. 6. c. 62))
Wednesfield Chapel Act 1746	20 Geo. 2. c. 27	17 June 1747
An Act for founding and building a Chapel in Wednesfield, in the Parish of Wolverhampton, in the County of Stafford.
Catterick Bridge to Durham Road Act 1746 (repealed)	20 Geo. 2. c. 28	17 June 1747
An Act for repairing the Road leading from Catherick Bridge, in the County of York, to Yarm, in the said County, and from thence to Stockton, in the County of Durham, and from thence, through Sedgefield, in the said County of Durham, to the City of Durham. (Repealed by Catterick Bridge to Durham Road Act 1788 (28 Geo. 3. c. 90))
Saint James, Westminster (Improvement) Act 1746 (repealed)	20 Geo. 2. c. 29	17 June 1747
An Act to confirm an Agreement made by the Rector and Vestrymen of the Parish of St. James, within the Liberty of Westminster, for enlarging the Church-yard of the said Parish, and for other Purposes therein mentioned. (Repealed by %[%[London Government (City of Westminster) Order in Council 1901]] (SR&O [[List of statutory rules and orders of the United Kingdom#19011901%]%]/278))
Treason Act 1746 (repealed)	20 Geo. 2. c. 30	17 June 1747
An Act for allowing Persons impeached of High Treason, whereby any Corruption of Blood may be made, or for Misprision of such Treason, to make their full Defence by Council. (Repealed by for England and Wales by Criminal Law Act 1967 (c. 58) and for Scotland by Statute Law (Repeals) Act 1973 (c. 39))
Gloucester and Hereford Roads Act 1746 (repealed)	20 Geo. 2. c. 31	17 June 1747
An Act for continuing the Term, and enlarging the Powers, granted by an Act passed in the Twelfth Year of His late Majesty's Reign, intituled, "An Act for repairing and widening the Roads from the City of Gloucester to the City of Hereford," (Note: Gloucester and Hereford Roads Act 1725 (12 Geo. 1. c. 13)) and for repairing other Roads in the County of Gloucester. (Repealed by Roads from Newent Act 1824 (5 Geo. 4. c. xi), Roads from Gloucester City Act 1833 (3 & 4 Will. 4. c. lv) and Roads through Huntley from Gloucester Act 1833 (3 & 4 Will. 4. lxxv))
University of Saint Andrews Act 1746	20 Geo. 2. c. 32	17 June 1747
An Act for uniting the Two Colleges of St. Salvator and St Leonard, in the University of St. Andrews, pursuant to an Agreement for that Purpose.
Saint Andrew, Holborn (Burial Ground) Act 1746 (repealed)	20 Geo. 2. c. 33	17 June 1747
An Act to enable the Parishioners of the Parish of St Andrew Holborn, in the City of London and County of Middlesex, (Note: St Andrew Holborn.) to purchase a convenient Piece of Ground, (Note: The burial ground was consecrated in 1754, and had its last internment in 1856. It was opened as a public park, St Andrew's Gardens, in 1885. It is located on the corner of Gray's Inn Road and Wren Street, Camden. 51°31′32″N 0°06′58″W) for an additional Burying Ground, for the Use of the said Parish, and to enable the said Parishioners to raise such Sum and Sums of Money as shall be necessary for that Purpose. (Repealed by %[%[London Government (Borough of Holborn) Order in Council 1901]] (SR&O [[List of statutory rules and orders of the United Kingdom#19011901%]%]/269))
Will of Sir Joseph Jekyll Act 1746 (repealed)	20 Geo. 2. c. 34	17 June 1747
An Act to enable His Majesty to allow to the Residuary Legatees of Sir Joseph Jekyll Knight, late Master of the Rolls, deceased, Part of the Legacy given by his Will to the Use of the Sinking Fund. (Repealed by Statute Law Revision Act 1948 (11 & 12 Geo. 6. c. 62))
Prize Act 1746 (repealed)	20 Geo. 2. c. 35	17 June 1747
An Act to indemnify Persons who have omitted to register their Letters of Attorney, appointing them Agents for Prizes, within the Time limited by Law, and for allowing further Time for that Purpose. (Repealed by Naval Prize Acts Repeal Act 1864 (27 & 28 Vict. c. 23))
Supply, etc. Act 1746 (repealed)	20 Geo. 2. c. 36	17 June 1747
An Act for granting to His Majesty a certain Sum of Money, out of the Sinking Fund, for the Service of the Year One Thousand Seven Hundred and Forty-seven, and also for enabling His Majesty to raise a further Sum of Money, for the Uses and Purposes therein mentioned, and for the further appropriating the Supplies granted in this Session of Parliament, and for applying a certain Sum of Money for defraying the Charge of the Allowances to several Officers and Private Gentlemen of the Two Troops of House Guards, and Three Regiments of Horse lately reduced, for the Year One Thousand Seven Hundred and Forty-seven, and for continuing the Bounties on the Exportation of British and Irish course Linens. (Repealed by Statute Law Revision Act 1867 (30 & 31 Vict. c. 59))
Return of Process by Sheriffs Act 1746 (repealed)	20 Geo. 2. c. 37	17 June 1747
An Act for the Ease of Sheriffs, with regard to the Return of Process. (Repealed by Sheriffs Act 1887 (50 & 51 Vict. c. 55))
Merchant Seamen Act 1746 (repealed)	20 Geo. 2. c. 38	17 June 1747
An Act for the Relief and Support of maimed and disabled Seamen, and the Widows and Children of such as shall be killed, slain, or drowned, in the Merchants Service. (Repealed by Merchant Shipping Repeal Act 1854 (17 & 18 Vict. c. 120))
Distillers Act 1746 (repealed)	20 Geo. 2. c. 39	17 June 1747
An Act for granting a Duty to His Majesty, to be paid by Distillers, upon Licenses taken out by them for retailing Spirituous Liquors. (Repealed by Statute Law Revision Act 1867 (30 & 31 Vict. c. 59))
Yarmouth Haven Act 1746 (repealed)	20 Geo. 2. c. 40	17 June 1747
An Act to revive, continue, and amend, an Act made in the Ninth Year of the Reign of His late Majesty King George the First, intituled, An Act for clearing, depthening, repairing, extending, maintaining, and improving, the Haven and Piers of Great Yarmouth, and for depthening and making more navigable the several Rivers emptying themselves at the said Town, and also for preserving Ships, wintering in the said Haven, from Accidents by Fire." (Note: Great Yarmouth Pier Act 1722 (9 Geo. 1. c. 10)) (Repealed by Statute Law Revision Act 1950 (14 Geo. 6. c. 6))
Vesting Act 1747 or the Forfeited Estates Act 1747 or the Crown Lands (Forfeited Estates) Act 1746 (repealed)	20 Geo. 2. c. 41	17 June 1747
An Act for vesting in His Majesty the Estates of certain Traitors, and for more effectually discovering the same, and applying the Produce thereof to the Use of His Majesty; and for ascertaining and satisfying the lawful Debts and Claims thereupon. (Repealed by Statute Law Revision Act 1948 (11 & 12 Geo. 6. c. 62))
Wales and Berwick Act 1746 (repealed)	20 Geo. 2. c. 42	17 June 1747
An Act to enforce the Execution of an Act of this Session of Parliament, (Note: National Debt Act 1746 (20 Geo. 2. c. 3)) for granting to His Majesty several Rates and Duties upon Houses, Windows, or Lights. (Repealed by Interpretation Act 1978 (c. 30))
Heritable Jurisdictions (Scotland) Act 1746 or the Sheriffs Act 1747	20 Geo. 2. c. 43	17 June 1747
An Act for taking away and abolishing the Heretable Jurisdictions in Scotland; and for making Satisfaction to the Proprietors thereof; and for restoring such Jurisdictions to the Crown; and for making more effectual Provision for the Administration of Justice throughout that Part of the United Kingdom, by the King’s Courts and Judges there; and for obliging all Persons acting as Procurators, Writers, or Agents, in the Law in Scotland, to take the Oaths, and for rendering the Union of the Two Kingdoms more complete.
Aliens Act 1746 (repealed)	20 Geo. 2. c. 44	17 June 1747
An Act to extend the Provisions of an Act made in the Thirteenth Year of His present Majesty's Reign, intituled, "An Act for naturalizing such Foreign Protestants, and others therein mentioned, as are settled, or shall settle, in any of His Majesty's Colonies, in America," (Note: Naturalization Act 1739 (13 Geo. 2. c. 7)) to other Foreign Protestants, who conscientiously scruple the taking of an Oath. (Repealed by Naturalization Act 1870 (33 & 34 Vict. c. 14))
Stamps Act 1746 (repealed)	20 Geo. 2. c. 45	17 June 1747
An Act to continue several Laws relating to the Manufactures of Sail Cloth and Silk, to give further Time for the Payment of Duties omitted to be paid for the Indentures or Contracts of Clerks and Apprentices, and for better securing the Payment of the said Duties, and declaring, That Prize Ships, lawfully condemned, shall be deemed British-built Ships, and for allowing Prize Goods to be landed, and secured in proper Warehouses, without Payment of any Duty, until it can be determined whether they are sit for Exportation of Home Consumption. (Repealed by Inland Revenue Repeal Act 1870 (33 & 34 Vict. c. 99))
Traitors Transported Act 1746 (repealed)	20 Geo. 2. c. 46	17 June 1747
An Act to prevent the Return of such Rebels and Traitors, concerned in the late Rebellion, as have been, or shall be, pardoned on Condition of Transportation, and also to hinder their going into the Enemy's Country. (Repealed by Statute Law Revision Act 1867 (30 & 31 Vict. c. 59))
Continuance of Laws Act 1746 (repealed)	20 Geo. 2. c. 47	17 June 1747
An Act to continue several Laws, for prohibiting the Importation of Books re-printed Abroad, and first composed or written and printed in Great Britain, for preventing Exactions of the Occupiers of Locks and Wears upon the River of Thames Westward, and for ascertaining the Rates of Water-carriage upon the said River, and for better securing the lawful Trade of His Majesty's Subjects to and from The East Indies, and for the more effectual preventing all His Majesty's Subjects trading thither under Foreign Commissions, and relating to Rice, to Frauds in the Customs, to the clandestine Running of Goods, and to Copper One of the British Plantations, and for the free Importation of Cochineal and Indico, and for Punishment of Persons destroying Turnpikes or Locks, or other Works erected by Authority of Parliament. (Repealed by Statute Law Revision Act 1867 (30 & 31 Vict. c. 59))
Indemnity Act 1746 (repealed)	20 Geo. 2. c. 48	17 June 1747
An Act to indemnify Persons who have omitted to qualify themselves for Offices and Promotions within the Time limited by Law, and for allowing further Time for that Purpose. (Repealed by Statute Law Revision Act 1867 (30 & 31 Vict. c. 59))
Thomas Paulin, Coal-Meter, Westminster Act 1746 (repealed)	20 Geo. 2. c. 49	17 June 1747
An Act for declaring valid such Acts as have been done by Thomas Paulin, as One of the Principal Land Coal Meters of the City and Liberty of Westminster, between the Twenty-ninth Day of September last, and the Eighth Day of November following. (Repealed by Statute Law Revision Act 1948 (11 & 12 Geo. 6. c. 62))
Tenures Abolition Act 1746	20 Geo. 2. c. 50	17 June 1747
An Act for taking away the tenure of ward holding in Scotland, and for converting the same into blanch and feu holdings; and for regulating the casualty of non-entry in certain cases; and for taking away the casualties of single and life-rent escheats, incurred there by horning and denunciation for civil causes; and for giving to heirs and successors there a summary process against superiors; and for discharging the attendance of vassals at head courts there; and for ascertaining the services of tenants there; and for allowing heirs of tailzie there to sell lands to the Crown for erecting buildings and making settlements in the Highlands.
Sales to the Crown Act 1746 (repealed)	20 Geo. 2. c. 51	17 June 1747
An Act to enlarge the Time limited by an Act of the last Session of Parliament, (Note: Disarming the Highlands, etc. Act 1745 (19 Geo. 2. c. 39)) for restraining the Use of the Highland Dress, and to enable Heirs of Tailzie, Guardians, Curators, and Trustees, in Scotland, to sell Lands to the Crown. (Repealed by Crown Estate Act 1961 (c. 55))
General Pardon Act 1746 or the Indemnity Act 1747 (repealed)	20 Geo. 2. c. 52	17 June 1747
An Act for the King's most gracious General and Fice Pardon. (Repealed by Statute Law Revision Act 1867 (30 & 31 Vict. c. 59))

=== Private acts ===
Short title	Citation	Royal assent
Long title
Enabling Richard Waynhouse and his heirs male to take the surname Emmott and no other, pursuant to the will of Christopher Emmott.	20 Geo. 2. c. 1 Pr.	5 February 1747
An Act to enable Richard Wainhouse and his Heirs Male to take and use the Surname of Emmott, and no other, pursuant to the Will of Christopher Emmott Esquire, deceased.
Harry Earl of Stamford's settled estate: sale of part for discharge of incumbrances.	20 Geo. 2. c. 2 Pr.	24 March 1747
An Act for Sale of Part of the settled Estate of Harry Earl of Stamford, in order to discharge several Encumbrances affecting the same.
Estates of Thomas Earl of Leicester and Lord Coke (his son): settlement of estates in Norfolk on marriage of Lord Coke with Lady Mary Campbell.	20 Geo. 2. c. 3 Pr.	24 March 1747
An Act for settling the Estates of Thomas Earl of Leicester and Edward Coke Esquire, commonly called Lord Coke, his only Son, in the County of Norfolk, on the Marriage of the said Edward Lord Coke with the Lady Mary Campbell, One of the Daughters of John late Duke of Argyll, deceased.
Estates of William Lord Byron and Elizabeth Shaw (an infant): settlement on their intermarriage.	20 Geo. 2. c. 4 Pr.	24 March 1747
An Act for settling the Estates of William Lord Byron and Elizabeth Shaw Spinster, an Infant, on their Intermarriage.
Enabling Sir Thomas Parkyns and Jane Parkyns to make a conveyance by way of settlement on their intermarriage despite their minority.	20 Geo. 2. c. 5 Pr.	24 March 1747
An Act to enable Sir Thomas Parkyns Baronet and Jane Parkyns (with the Consent of then Guardians and Trustees) to make a Conveyance, by Way of Settlement, on their Intermarriage, notwithstanding their Minority.
Estates late of Thomas Taylor and Thomas Taylor (his son) (deceased): sale or leasing for payment of debts and making of partitions.	20 Geo. 2. c. 6 Pr.	24 March 1747
An Act for raising Money, by Leasing or Sale of the Estates late of Thomas Taylor Esquire the Father and Thomas Taylor Esquire the Son, deceased, to discharge the Debts and Encumbrances assecting the same, and for making a Partition of such Estates, or so much thereof as shall not be sold, for the Purposes aforesaid.
Smith's Name Act 1746	20 Geo. 2. c. 7 Pr.	24 March 1747
An Act to enable Lillie Smith and his Heirs by Valentina his Wife (formerly Valentina Aynscombe) to take and use the Surname of Aynscombe, pursuant to the Will of Thomas Aynscombe Esquire, deceased.
Enabling Edmund Dring to take the surname and arms of Garforth.	20 Geo. 2. c. 8 Pr.	24 March 1747
An Act to enable Edmund Garforth, formerly called Edmund Dring, and his Heirs, to take, use, and bear, the Surname and Arms of Garforth.
Confirming a decree of the Court of the Duchy of Lancaster concerning Sutton Marsh (Lincolnshire) and a conveyance from Lascells Metcalfe to the Corporation of Guy's Hospital.	20 Geo. 2. c. 9 Pr.	24 March 1747
An Act to confirm a Decree of the Court of the Dutchy of Lancaster, concerning certain Marsh Lands called Sutton Marsh, in the County of Lincoln, and a Conveyance from Lascells Metcalfe Esquire, of the same, to the Corporation of the President and Governors of the Hospital founded at the sole Costs and Charges of Thomas Guy Esquire.
Thomas Kynaston's Estate Act 1746	20 Geo. 2. c. 10 Pr.	24 March 1747
An Act for Sale of the Rectory of Saint Botolph without Aldgate, London, the Estate of Thomas Kynaston Clerk, comprized in his Marriage Settlement, and for purchasing another Estate, to be settled to the Uses of the said Settlement.
Simon Burton's estates in Wiltshire and Hampshire: vesting in trustees to raise money for payment of debts and incumbrances.	20 Geo. 2. c. 11 Pr.	24 March 1747
An Act for vesting the Estates of Doctor Simon Burton, deceased, in the Counties of Wilts and Southampton, in Trustees, to raise Money, for the Payment of several Debts and Encumbrances, and for other Purposes therein mentioned.
Confirming, establishing and rendering more effectual certain articles of agreement between the heirs at law and devisees of Joceline Earl of Leicester for the settlement and disposition of his estate.	20 Geo. 2. c. 12 Pr.	17 June 1747
An Act for confirming and establishing certain Articles of Agreement, between the Heirs at Law and Devisees of Joceline late Earl of Leicester, deceased, for the Settlement and Disposition of the Real Estate of the said Earl, and for rendering the said Agreement more effectual for the Purposes thereby intended.
Richard Oakley's estates in Salop. and Oxfordshire: raising money for payment of debts and incumbrances and providing recompense for same.	20 Geo. 2. c. 13 Pr.	17 June 1747
An Act for raising Money, out of the settled Estates of Richard Oakeley Esquire, in the Counties of Salop and Oxford, for the Payment of several Debts and Encumbrances, and for providing a Recompense for the same, in such Manner as is therein mentioned.
Henry Talbot's Estate Act 1746	20 Geo. 2. c. 14 Pr.	17 June 1747
An Act for vesting Put of the settled Estate of Henry Talbot Esquire, in the County of Warwick, in him, in Fee Simple, discharged of the Uses of his Marriage Settlement, upon his settling other Lands, of greater Value, to the same Uses.
William Moore's Estate Act 1746	20 Geo. 2. c. 15 Pr.	17 June 1747
An Act for Sale of the Estates of William Moore Esquire, in the Counties of Sussex, Surrey, and Stafford, for Payment of Debts and Legacies.
Colemore's Estate Act 1746	20 Geo. 2. c. 16 Pr.	17 June 1747
An Act to empower Anne Colmore Widow and her Assigns, during the Life of Thomas Colmore Merchant, to make Building Leases of Lands, in and near Birmingham, in the County of Warwick.
Elizabeth and Diana Sambrooke's Estate Act 1746	20 Geo. 2. c. 17 Pr.	17 June 1747
An Act to enable the Guardian of Elizabeth Sambrooke and Diana Sambrooke, Infants, to join with Mary Sambrooke, their Sister, in making Building Leases of divers Houses and Tenements, in the County of Middlesex.
Estates of William Mitchell and other infants: empowering guardians to make leases of estates in Huntingdonshire, Surrey, Middlesex, Cambridgeshire, Leicestershire, Kent, Somerset and Norfolk during their minorities.	20 Geo. 2. c. 18 Pr.	17 June 1747
An Act to empower the Guardians of William Mitchell and other Infants to make Leases of then Estates, in the several Counties of Huntingdon, Surrey, Middlesex, Cambridge, Leicester, Kent, Somerset, and Norfolk, during their Minorities.
Thomas Garrard's Estate Act 1746	20 Geo. 2. c. 19 Pr.	17 June 1747
An Act for making a Settlement of the Real and Personal Estate of Thomas Garrard Esquire, deceased, pursuant to his Intention declared in his Life-time, and at the Desire, and with the Consent, of his Six Sons.
Thomas Rolt's Estate Act 1746	20 Geo. 2. c. 20 Pr.	17 June 1747
An Act for vesting several Estates of Thomas Rolt Esquire in Trustees, to be sold, for raising Money, to discharge Encumbrances affecting the same, and other Debts, and for securing an Equivalent, in respect of the settled Part of such Estates, for the Benefit of his Wife and Infant Son, and for the providing Portions for his Daughters, and for other Purposes.
Richard Powys' Estate Act 1746	20 Geo. 2. c. 21 Pr.	17 June 1747
An Act for Sale of the Real Estate of Richard Powys Esquire, deceased, for Payment of his Debts and Daughters Portions, and for other Purposes therein expressed.
Estates of Jane, Anne, Mary and Susanna Awdrey Kemeys (infants): sale of estates in Tewin and Datchworth (Hertfordshire) pursuant to an agreement made by their trustees.	20 Geo. 2. c. 22 Pr.	17 June 1747
An Act for Sale of certain Estates, in Tewin and Datchworth, in the County of Hertford, belonging to Jone, Anne, Mary, and Susanna Awdrey Kemeys, Infants, pursuant to an Agreement entered into by their Trustees for that Purpose.
John Curtis' Estates Act 1746	20 Geo. 2. c. 23 Pr.	17 June 1747
An Act for Sale of the settled and other Estate of John Curtis, in the County of Norfolk, and applying Part of the Money arising thereby in Payment of Legacies and Debts, and applying other Part of such Money in the Purchase of other Estates, to be settled to the like Uses, and for other Purposes therein mentioned.
Vesting the capital messuage and grounds called Great Frogmore, devised by the will of Mary Duchess of Northumberland, in trustees to be sold.	20 Geo. 2. c. 24 Pr.	17 June 1747
An Act for vesting the Capital Messuage, called Great Frogmore, with the Lands and Grounds thereunto belonging, devised by the Will of Mary late Dutchess of Northumberland, in Trustees, to be sold, for the Purposes therein mentioned.
Estate of Robert Gwillym and Robert Gwillym (his son): sale of estates in Hertfordshire, Monmouthshire and Gloucestershire for payment of incumbrances and settlement of lands in Lancashire in lieu.	20 Geo. 2. c. 25 Pr.	17 June 1747
An Act for Sale of certain Estates, in the Counties of Hereford, Monmouth, and Gloucester, of Robert Gwillym Esquire and Robert Gwillym his Son, for discharging Encumbrances affecting the same, and for settling, in Lieu thereof, other Lands and Hereditaments in the County of Lancaster, and for other Purposes therein mentioned.
Estate late of Robert Drew (deceased): vesting a farm and lands in Cullompton (Devon) in trustees to be conveyed to Henry Cruwys pursuant to an agreement made with Mary Drew, widow, and discharging a mortgage on the same.	20 Geo. 2. c. 26 Pr.	17 June 1747
An Act for vesting a Farm and Lands in Cullumpton, in the County of Devon, late the Estate of Robert Drew Gentleman, deceased, in Trustees, in order to convey the same to Henry Cruwys Gentleman, pursuant to an Agreement with Mary Drew Widow, and for discharging a Mortgage on the said Estate.
Edward Masters' Estate Act 1746	20 Geo. 2. c. 27 Pr.	17 June 1747
An Act for Sale of the Estate of Edward Masters, deceased, for Payment of his Debts, and for other Purposes therein mentioned.
Corbyn Morris's Divorce Act 1746	20 Geo. 2. c. 28 Pr.	17 June 1747
An Act to dissolve the Marriage of Corbyn Morris Esquire with Elizabeth Fanshawe his now Wife, and to enable him to marry again, and for other Purposes therein mentioned.
Kelfield (Yorkshire) Inclosure Act 1746	20 Geo. 2. c. 29 Pr.	17 June 1747
An Act to empower Mary Stillington Widow to execute a Power vested in Joseph Stillington Esquire, her late Husband, deceased, for raising Money, to complete the Enclosure of the Common Fields and Common Grounds, in the Manor of Kelfield, in the County of York.
Thomas Bushell's Name Act 1746	20 Geo. 2. c. 30 Pr.	17 June 1747
An Act to enable Thomas Bushell Esquire, and his Descendants, to take and use the Surname and Arms of Fettiplace.
Naturalization of Mark Liotard, Henry Uhthoff and John Ziegell Act 1746	20 Geo. 2. c. 31 Pr.	17 June 1747
An Act for naturalizing Mark Liotard, Henry Uhthoff, and John David Ziegell.
Naturalization of Albert Vandenvelde Act 1746	20 Geo. 2. c. 32 Pr.	17 June 1747
An Act for naturalizing Albert Vandenvelde Merchant.

=== Sources ===
- Pickering, Danby, ed. (1765). The Statutes at Large. Vol. 19: From the 20th to the 23rd Year of King George II. Printed by Joseph Bentham – via Internet Archive.
- Pickering, Danby, ed. (1765). The Statutes at Large. Vol. 19: From the 20th to the 23rd Year of King George II. Printed by Joseph Bentham – via Google Books.
- Britain, Great (1764). The Statutes at Large from Magna Charta to the [last Session of Parliament, 1225-1763]. Vol. 7. M. Basket – via Google Books.
- Journals of the House of Commons. Vol. 25. London: His Majesty's Stationery Office. 1803. pp. 189–409 – via Google Books.
- Chronological Table of and Index to the Statutes. Vol. 1: To the End of the Session 59 Vict. Sess. 2 (1895) (13th ed.). London: Her Majesty's Stationery Office. 1896. pp. 110–111 – via Google Books.
- "Acts of the Parliament of Great Britain from 1746". legislation.gov.uk. The National Archives.

== See also ==
- List of acts of the Parliament of Great Britain
