= Treason Act 1714 =

Act of the Parliament of Great Britain

- Act of Parliament
- Parliament of Great Britain
- Long title: An Act for the more easy and speedy Trial of such Persons as have levied, or shall levy, War against His Majesty.
- Citation: 1 Geo. 1. St. 2. c. 33
- Territorial extent: Great Britain

Dates
- Royal assent: 6 March 1716
- Commencement: 17 March 1715 (Note: Start of session.)
- Repealed: 15 July 1867
Other legislation
Repealed by	Statute Law Revision Act 1867
Relates to	Treason in Scotland Act 1714; Crown Lands (Forfeited Estates) Act 1715; Treason Act 1746; Crown Lands (Forfeited Estates) Act 1746; Traitors Transported Act 1746

Status: Repealed

Text of statute as originally enacted

The Treason Act 1714 or Trial of Rebels Act 1715 (1 Geo. 1. St. 2. c. 33) was an act of the Parliament of Great Britain passed during the Jacobite Rising of 1715 (but backdated to 1714: see Acts of Parliament (Commencement) Act 1793 (33 Geo. 3. c. 13) for the explanation). Its long title was An act for the more easy and speedy trial of such persons as have levied or shall levy war against his Majesty. It enacted that anyone who was in custody for high treason before 23 January 1716 could be tried anywhere in England, regardless of where they had allegedly committed their crime. Under common law a trial normally had to take place in the county where the crime happened. (The act also preserved the right of peers to be tried by their peers.)

The Jurors (Scotland) Act 1745 (19 Geo. 2. c. 9) extended the national jurisdiction in treason cases to all crimes of treason, whenever committed.

Crown Lands (Forfeited Estates) Act 1715
- Act of Parliament
- Parliament of Great Britain
- Long title: An Act for appointing Commissioners to inquire of the Estates of certain Traitors, and of Popish Recusants, and of Estates given to superstitious Uses, in order to raise Money out of them, severally, for the Use of the Public.
- Citation: 1 Geo. 1. St. 2. c. 50
- Territorial extent: Great Britain

Dates
- Royal assent: 26 June 1716
- Commencement: 29 June 1715 (Note: Section 1.)
- Repealed: 15 December 1926
Other legislation
Repealed by	Roman Catholic Relief Act 1926
Relates to	Taxation Act 1722; Forfeited Estates (Derwentwater Estate) Act 1731; Forfeited Estates (Greenwich Hospital) Act 1734; Crown Lands (Forfeited Estates) (Greenwich Hospital) Act 1737; Crown Lands (Forfeited Estates) Act 1746; Crown Lands (Forfeited Estates) Act 1748

Status: Repealed

Text of statute as originally enacted

Another act in 1715, Crown Lands (Forfeited Estates) Act 1715 (1 Geo. 1. St. 2. c. 50), enacted that anyone attainted of treason between 29 June 1715 and 24 June 1718 was to have their lands forfeited to the Crown for public use. Also, from 1 November 1716, any hereditary office they might have held was to be extinguished.

Treason in Scotland Act 1714
- Act of Parliament
- Parliament of Great Britain
- Long title: An Act for encouraging all Superiors, Vassals, Landlords, and Tenants, in Scotland, who do and shall continue in their Duty and Loyalty to His Majesty King George; and for discouraging all Superiors, Vassals, Landlords, and Tenants there, who have been, or shall be, guilty of rebellious Practices against His said Majesty; and for making void all fraudulent Entails, Tailzies, and Conveyances, made there, for barring or excluding the Effect of Forfeitures that may have been, or shall be, incurred there, on any such Account; as also for calling any suspected Person or Persons, whose Estate or principal Residence is in Scotland, to appear at Edinburgh, or where it shall be judged expedient, to find Bail for their good Behaviour; and for the better disarming disaffected Persons in Scotland.
- Citation: 1 Geo. 1. St. 2. c. 20
- Territorial extent: Scotland (Note: Section 1.)

Dates
- Royal assent: 30 August 1715
- Commencement: 17 March 1715 (Note: Start of session.)
- Repealed: 13 July 1871
Other legislation
Amended by	Statute Law Revision Act 1863
Repealed by	Promissory Oaths Act 1871

Status: Repealed

Text of statute as originally enacted

A similar act was also passed for Scotland, the Treason in Scotland Act 1714 (1 Geo. 1. St. 2. c. 20). This stated that if anyone with land in Scotland was guilty of treason because they had corresponded with the pretender to the throne, James Francis Edward Stuart (the "Old Pretender"), they were to forfeit their lands to their vassal (if they owned the land) or to their landlord (if they occupied the land as a tenant), if that person was loyal to the Crown. However any person who stood to gain their land could not give evidence against them. If the loyal vassal or landlord did not claim the land within 6 months of the traitor's conviction, the land was to belong to the Crown instead, "for preventing frauds or collusion in order to evade this act." Any conveyance of land done since 1 August 1714, and any future conveyance done by anyone convicted of treason, was void. Creditors of the convicted traitors were not to be prejudiced by the act.

== See also ==
- Security of the Sovereign Act 1714
- Riot Act (1714)
- Treason Act 1746
- Correspondence with James the Pretender (High Treason) Act 1701
- Treason Act
