= Sheriffs (Scotland) Act 1747 =

Act of the Parliament of Great Britain

Sheriffs (Scotland) Act 1747 (Note: The citation of this act by this short title was authorised by section 1 of, and the first schedule to, the Short Titles Act 1896. Due to the repeal of those provisions it is now authorised by section 19(2) of the Interpretation Act 1978.)
- Act of Parliament
- Parliament of Great Britain
- Long title: An Act for the more effectual Trial and Punishment of High Treason and Misprision of High Treason, in the Highlands of Scotland; and for abrogating the Practice of taking down the Evidence in Writing in certain Criminal Prosecutions; and for making some further Regulations relating to Sheriffs Depute and Stewarts Depute, and their Substitutes; and for other Purposes therein mentioned
- Citation: 21 Geo. 2. c. 19
- Territorial extent: Great Britain

Dates
- Royal assent: 13 May 1748
- Commencement: 1 April 1748 (Note: Section 1.)
- Expired: 1 April 1755 (Note: Section 5.)
- Repealed: 22 December 1925
Other legislation
Amended by	Treason, etc. Act 1759; Treason Act 1760; Statute Law Revision Act 1887; Statute Law Revision Act 1888; Statute Law Revision Act 1892; Statute Law Revision Act 1892; Sheriff Courts (Scotland) Act 1907
Repealed by	Statute Law Revision Act 1867; Statute Law Revision Act 1883; Statute Law Revision Act 1892; Sheriff Courts (Scotland) Act 1907; Circuit Courts and Criminal Procedure (Scotland) Act 1925
Relates to	Treason Act 1708; Habeas Corpus Suspension Act 1745; Court of Session (Scotland) Act 1745; Jurors (Scotland) Act 1745; Habeas Corpus Suspension (No. 2) Act 1745; Attainder of Earl of Kellie and Others Act 1745; Heritable Jurisdictions (Scotland) Act 1746

Status: Repealed

Text of statute as originally enacted

Treason, etc. Act 1759
- Act of Parliament
- Parliament of Great Britain
- Long title: An Act for reviving and continuing so much of an Act, made in the Twenty-first Year of His present Majesty's Reign, as relates to the more effectual Trial and Punishment of High Treason and Misprision of High Treason, in The Highlands of Scotland; and also for continuing Two other Acts, one made in the Nineteenth Year, and the other made in the Twenty-first Year, of His present Majesty's Reign, so far as they relate to the more effectual disarming The Highlands of Scotland, and for securing the Peace thereof.
- Citation: 33 Geo. 2. c. 26
- Territorial extent: Great Britain

Dates
- Royal assent: 22 May 1760
- Commencement: 1 June 1760 (Note: Section 1.)
- Repealed: 15 July 1867
Other legislation
Amends	Jurors (Scotland) Act 1745; Disarming the Highlands, etc. Act 1745; Sheriffs (Scotland) Act 1747
Repealed by	Statute Law Revision Act 1867

Status: Repealed

Text of statute as originally enacted

The Sheriffs (Scotland) Act 1747 (Note: The act was actually passed in 1748, but is listed under 1747 because under the common law Acts of Parliament took effect retrospectively from the beginning of the session in which they were passed, which in this case was 1747: see the article Acts of Parliament (Commencement) Act 1793 for the explanation as to why. However this act was expressed to take effect from 1 April 1748.) (21 Geo. 2. c. 19) was an act of the Parliament of Great Britain which applied only to Scotland.

Section 1 of the act provided that anyone who was prosecuted on or after 1 April 1748 for treason or misprision of treason could be tried anywhere in Scotland if the crime had been committed in any of the shires of Dunbartain, Stirling, (Note: Spelled "Sterling" in the Act.) Perth, Kincardine, Aberdeen, Inverness, Nairn, Cromarty, (Note: Spelled "Cromartie" in the act.) Argyll, Forfarshire, Banff, (Note: Spelled "Bamff" in the act.) Sutherland, Caithness, Elgine, Ross, and Orkney. Normally a crime had to be tried in the shire where it had been committed.

Section 2 of the provided that in such a trial, the jurors could come from adjoining counties, instead of (as would otherwise be the case) the county where the trial was held.

Section 3 of the act also provided that His Majesty's Advocate could move the trial to the High Court of Justiciary.

Section 4 of the act that peers had the right to be tried by their peers.

Section 5 of the act provided that sections 1 to 5 of the act expired after seven years, but were later revived again for another seven years in 1760 by the Treason, etc. Act 1759 (33 Geo. 2. c. 26).

Section 12 of the act also began the process of grouping the smaller shires into a single sheriffdom, by creating shared sheriffdoms for:

- Fife and Kinross
- Stirling and Clackmannan
- Argyll and Bute
- Elgin and Nairn
- Sutherland and Caithness
- Ross and Cromarty

== Subsequent developments ==
Section 13 of the act was repealed by section 4 of, and the schedule to, the Circuit Courts and Criminal Procedure (Scotland) Act 1925 (15 & 16 Geo. 5. c. 81), which came into force on 22 December 1925.

== See also ==
- Treason Act
- Jurors (Scotland) Act 1745
