= Court of Session (Scotland) Act 1745 =

Act of the Parliament of Great Britain

- Act of Parliament
- Parliament of Great Britain
- Long title: An Act for adjourning the Court of Session in Scotland; and for remedying the Inconveniencies arising from the Surcease of Justice in that Part of the Kingdom.
- Citation: 19 Geo. 2. c. 7
- Territorial extent: Great Britain

Dates
- Royal assent: 13 February 1746
- Commencement: 1 November 1745 (Note: Section 1.)
- Expired: 1 June 1746
- Repealed: 15 July 1867
Other legislation
Repealed by	Statute Law Revision Act 1867
Relates to	Habeas Corpus Suspension Act 1745; Militia Act 1745; Habeas Corpus Suspension (No. 2) Act 1745; Jurors (Scotland) Act 1745; Habeas Corpus Suspension Act 1746; Sheriffs (Scotland) Act 1747

Status: Repealed

Text of statute as originally enacted

The Court of Session (Scotland) Act 1745 (19 Geo. 2. c. 7) was an act of the Parliament of Great Britain passed in 1745 and expressly repealed in 1867. It adjourned the Scottish Court of Session, which was unable to sit whilst Edinburgh was occupied by Jacobite forces.

The act adjourned the court from 1 November 1745 to 1 June 1746. It further provided that the time period between 16 September 1745 (when Edinburgh was occupied) to 1 June 1746 was to be ignored for legal reckoning, and that any court proceedings active were to be continued in the same state on 1 June 1746 as they had been on 1 November 1745.

== Subsequent developments ==
The whole act was repealed by section 1 of, and the schedule to, the Statute Law Revision Act 1867 (30 & 31 Vict. c. 59), which came into force on 15 July 1867.
