= Treason Act 1746 =

Act of the Parliament of Great Britain

Treason Act 1746 (Note: The citation of this act by this short title was authorised by section 1 of, and the first schedule to, the Short Titles Act 1896. Due to the repeal of those provisions it is now authorised by section 19(2) of the Interpretation Act 1978.)
- Act of Parliament
- Parliament of Great Britain
- Long title: An Act for allowing Persons impeached of High Treason, whereby any Corruption of Blood may be made, or for Misprision of such Treason, to make their full Defence by Council.
- Citation: 20 Geo. 2. c. 30
- Territorial extent: Great Britain

Dates
- Royal assent: 17 June 1747
- Commencement: 1 June 1747 (Note: Section 1.)
- Repealed: England and Wales: 1 January 1968; Scotland: 18 July 1973

Other legislation
- Repealed by: England and Wales: Criminal Law Act 1967; Scotland: Statute Law (Repeals) Act 1973
- Relates to: Treason Act 1714; Vesting Act 1747; Traitors Transported Act 1746

Status: Repealed

Text of statute as originally enacted

The Treason Act 1746 (20 Geo. 2. c. 30) (Note: Also cited as c. 41 in some statute books.) was an act of the Parliament of Great Britain. The long title is "An Act for allowing Persons impeached of High Treason, whereby any Corruption of Blood may be made, or for Misprision of such Treason, to make their full Defence by Council."

The act commenced on 1 June 1747. It entitled anyone impeached by the House of Commons on a charge of high treason or misprision of treason to be defended by up to two "council learned in the law".

== Subsequent developments ==
The whole act was repealed for England and Wales by section 10(2) of, and part I of schedule 3 to, the Criminal Law Act 1967, which came into force on 1 January 1968.

The whole act was repealed for Scotland by section 1(1) of, and part V of schedule 1 to, the Statute Law (Repeals) Act 1973, which came into force on 18 July 1973.

== Other treason-related legislation in the same year ==
Vesting Act 1747
- Act of Parliament
- Parliament of Great Britain
- Long title: An Act for vesting in His Majesty the Estates of certain Traitors, and for more effectually discovering the same, and applying the Produce thereof to the Use of His Majesty; and for ascertaining and satisfying the lawful Debts and Claims thereupon.
- Citation: 20 Geo. 2. c. 41
- Territorial extent: Great Britain

Dates
- Royal assent: 17 June 1747
- Commencement: 24 June 1745
- Repealed: 30 July 1948

Other legislation
- Repealed by: Statute Law Revision Act 1948
- Relates to: Treason Act 1714; Crown Lands (Forfeited Estates) Act 1715; Treason Act 1746; Traitors Transported Act 1746; Crown Lands (Forfeited Estates) Act 1748

Status: Repealed

Text of statute as originally enacted

- The Vesting Act 1747 (20 Geo. 2. c. 41) stated that any traitor who had been convicted since 24 June 1745, or who had been attainted by statute before 24 June 1748, was to automatically forfeit all of their property to the Crown, without the need for any further legal procedure whatsoever. (Note: This act is sometimes called the Forfeited Estates Act 1747, the Crown Lands, Forfeited Estates Act 1746, or the Vesting Act 1747. The amended title of this Act was "An Act for vesting in His Majesty the Estates of certain Traitors . . .". The title originally read "An Act for vesting in His Majesty the Estates of certain Traitors, and for more effectually discovering the same, and applying the Produce thereof to the Use of His Majesty; and for ascertaining and satisfying the lawful Debts and Claims thereupon.")

Traitors Transported Act 1746
- Act of Parliament
- Parliament of Great Britain
- Long title: An Act to prevent the Return of such Rebels and Traitors, concerned in the late Rebellion, as have been, or shall be, pardoned on Condition of Transportation, and also to hinder their going into the Enemy's Country.
- Citation: 20 Geo. 2. c. 46
- Territorial extent: Great Britain

Dates
- Royal assent: 17 June 1747
- Commencement: 18 November 1746 (Note: Start of session.)
- Repealed: 15 July 1867

Other legislation
- Repealed by: Statute Law Revision Act 1867
- Relates to: Treason Act 1714; Treason Act 1746; Vesting Act 1747

Status: Repealed

Text of statute as originally enacted

- A third act, the Traitors Transported Act 1746 (20 Geo. 2. c. 46), made it a felony, punishable with death without benefit of clergy, for anyone who had been pardoned for treason and transported to America to return to Great Britain or Ireland, or to go to the dominions of the French or Spanish kings. It was also felony for anyone else to aid and abet a pardoned traitor to commit the same offence, or to correspond with one. However an indictment had to be brought within two years.

== See also ==
- High treason in the United Kingdom
- Treason Act
- Treason Act 1714
