= Roman Catholic Relief Act 1926 =

Act of the Parliament of the United Kingdom relieving British Catholics

Roman Catholic Relief Act 1926 (Note: Section 4.)
- Act of Parliament
- Parliament of the United Kingdom
- Long title: An Act to provide for the further relief of His Majesty's Roman Catholic subjects
- Citation: 16 & 17 Geo. 5. c. 55
- Introduced by: Francis Blundell and Dennis Herbert (Commons)
- Territorial extent: England and Wales; Scotland

Dates
- Royal assent: 15 December 1926
- Commencement: 15 December 1926 (Note: The Acts of Parliament (Commencement) Act 1793.)
- Repealed: 16 November 1989
Other legislation
Amends	Religious Houses Act 1558; Roman Catholic Relief Act 1791; Roman Catholic Relief Act 1829; Roman Catholic Charities Act 1832; Roman Catholic Charities Act 1860
Repeals/revokes	Putting away of Books and Images Act 1549; Crown Lands (Forfeited Estates) Act 1715
Repealed by	Statute Law (Repeals) Act 1989
Relates to	Treason Act 1714

Status: Repealed

Text of statute as originally enacted

The Roman Catholic Relief Act 1926 (16 & 17 Geo. 5. c. 55) was an act of the Parliament of the United Kingdom that removed almost all the remaining legal disabilities affecting Roman Catholics in Great Britain. It was sponsored by the Conservative MPs Francis Blundell and Dennis Herbert.

One of the triggers of the bill had been the successful blocking of a Corpus Christi procession on public roads in Carfin by the local MP and Orangeman Hugh Ferguson.

The Private Members Bill was opposed by Thomas Inskip the Solicitor General. The Bill was successfully amended to exclude Northern Ireland but an amendment to remove Scotland failed with the opposition led partly by Fergusson's successor James Barr.

It repealed bans such as admitting new members to Catholic religious orders. public Catholic processions and most remaining disabilities of Catholics. It also repealed the Putting away of Books and Images Act 1549 (3 & 4 Edw. 6. c. 10) and Crown Lands (Forfeited Estates) Act 1715 (1 Geo. 1. St. 2. c. 50).

== Subsequent developments ==
The whole act was repealed by section 1(1) of, and part VIII of schedule 1 to, the Statute Law (Repeals) Act 1989, which came into force on 16 November 1989.

== Bibliography ==
- Rosie, Michael John (2001). Religion and Sectarianism in Modern Scotland (Doctor of Philosophy thesis). University of Edinburgh.
