= Habeas Corpus Suspension Act 1745 =

Act of the Parliament of Great Britain

- Act of Parliament
- Parliament of Great Britain
- Long title: An Act to empower His Majesty to secure and detain such Persons as His Majesty shall suspect are conspiring against His Person and Government.
- Citation: 19 Geo. 2. c. 1
- Territorial extent: Great Britain

Dates
- Royal assent: 21 October 1745
- Commencement: 17 October 1745 (Note: Start of session.)
- Expired: 19 April 1746 (Note: Section 1.)
- Repealed: 15 July 1867
Other legislation
Amended by	Habeas Corpus Suspension (No. 2) Act 1745; Habeas Corpus Suspension Act 1746
Repealed by	Statute Law Revision Act 1867
Relates to	Militia Act 1745; Court of Session (Scotland) Act 1745; Jurors (Scotland) Act 1745; Attainder of Earl of Kellie and Others Act 1745; Sheriffs (Scotland) Act 1747

Status: Repealed

Text of statute as originally enacted

Habeas Corpus Suspension (No. 2) Act 1745
- Act of Parliament
- Parliament of Great Britain
- Long title: An Act for continuing an Act of this present Session of Parliament, intituled, "An Act to empower His Majesty to secure and detain such Persons as His Majesty shall suspect are conspiring against His Person and Government."
- Citation: 19 Geo. 2. c. 17
- Territorial extent: Great Britain

Dates
- Royal assent: 19 April 1746
- Commencement: 19 April 1746
- Repealed: 15 July 1867
Other legislation
Amends	Habeas Corpus Suspension Act 1745
Repealed by	Statute Law Revision Act 1867
Relates to	Militia Act 1745; Court of Session (Scotland) Act 1745; Jurors (Scotland) Act 1745; Habeas Corpus Suspension Act 1746; Sheriffs (Scotland) Act 1747

Status: Repealed

Text of statute as originally enacted

Habeas Corpus Suspension Act 1746
- Act of Parliament
- Parliament of Great Britain
- Long title: An Act for the further continuing an Act made in the last Session of Parliament, intituled, "An Act to empower His Majesty to secure and detain such Persons as His Majesty shall suspect are conspiring against His Person and Government."
- Citation: 20 Geo. 2. c. 1
- Territorial extent: Great Britain

Dates
- Royal assent: 21 November 1746
- Commencement: 18 November 1746
- Expired: 20 February 1747
- Repealed: 15 July 1867
Other legislation
Amends	Habeas Corpus Suspension Act 1745
Repealed by	Statute Law Revision Act 1867
Relates to	Militia Act 1745; Court of Session (Scotland) Act 1745; Jurors (Scotland) Act 1745; Habeas Corpus Suspension (No. 2) Act 1745; Sheriffs (Scotland) Act 1747

Status: Repealed

Text of statute as originally enacted

The Habeas Corpus Suspension Act 1745 (19 Geo. 2. c. 1) was an act of the Parliament of Great Britain passed on 18 October 1745, and formally repealed in 1867. It made various provisions for arresting and imprisoning those suspected of treason during the Second Jacobite Rising. The act was continued in force by the Habeas Corpus Suspension (No. 2) Act 1745 (19 Geo. 2. c. 17) and by the Habeas Corpus Suspension Act 1746 (20 Geo. 2. c. 1) before expiring.

The act provided that those suspected of high treason could be detained without bail until 19 April 1746; their horses could be seized and the owners charged for their keeping. Members of Parliament were exempt from the act unless the consent of their House was given. For the duration of the act, the Scottish act preventing wrongful imprisonment was suspended.

== Subsequent developments ==
The whole act was repealed by section 1 of, and the schedule to, the Statute Law Revision Act 1867 (30 & 31 Vict. c. 59), which came into force on 15 July 1867.
