= Security of the Sovereign Act 1714 =

Act of the Parliament of Great Britain

- Act of Parliament
- Parliament of Great Britain
- Long title: An Act for the further security of His Majesty's person and government, and the succession of the Crown in the heirs of the late Princess Sophia being Protestants, and for extinguishing the hopes of the pretended Prince of Wales, and his open and secret abettors.
- Citation: 1 Geo. 1. St. 2. c. 13
- Territorial extent: Great Britain; Isle of Man

Dates
- Royal assent: 20 August 1715
- Commencement: 17 March 1715 (Note: Start of session.)
- Repealed: 13 July 1871
Other legislation
Amended by	Treason Act 1766; Statute Law Revision Act 1867; Universities Tests Act 1871
Repealed by	Promissory Oaths Act 1871
Relates to	Act of Settlement; Security of the Succession, etc. Act 1701; Security of the Succession, etc. Act 1702; Treason Act 1714

Status: Repealed

Text of statute as originally enacted

The Security of the Sovereign Act 1714 (1 Geo. 1. St. 2. c. 13) was an act of the Parliament of Great Britain. The Act required all civil and military officers; members of colleges; teachers; preachers; and lawyers to take the oaths of allegiance and supremacy and of abjuration of the Pretender.

== Subsequent developments ==
The whole act, so far as unrepealed, was repealed by section 8 of, and the schedule to, the Universities Tests Act 1871 (34 & 35 Vict. c. 26), which came into force on 16 June 1871.

The whole act was repealed for Great Britain by section 1 of, and part I of schedule one to, the Promissory Oaths Act 1871 (34 & 35 Vict. c. 48), which came into force on 13 July 1871.

The whole act was repealed for the Isle of Man by section 1(2) of, and schedule 2 to, the Statute Law Revision (Isle of Man) Act 1991, which came into force on 25 July 1991.

== See also ==
- Treason Act 1714
