= Militia Act 1745 =

Act of the Parliament of Great Britain

- Act of Parliament
- Parliament of Great Britain
- Long title: An Act to raise the Militia of that Part of Great Britain called England, although the Month's Pay formerly advanced hath not yet been re-paid; and to raise such Part of the said Militia as shall be judged most proper, ready, and convenient.
- Citation: 19 Geo. 2. c. 2
- Territorial extent: Great Britain

Dates
- Royal assent: 13 November 1745
- Commencement: 17 October 1745 (Note: Start of session.)
- Expired: 30 November 1746 (Note: Section 1.)
- Repealed: 15 July 1867
Other legislation
Repealed by	Statute Law Revision Act 1867
Relates to	Habeas Corpus Suspension Act 1745

Status: Repealed

Text of statute as originally enacted

The Militia Act 1745 (19 Geo. 2. c. 2) was an act of the Parliament of Great Britain passed in 1745 and formally repealed in 1867. It made provision for calling out the militia in England during the Second Jacobite Rising.

The act provided that at any time up to the 30 November 1746, the militia could be embodied for active service, with each soldier to be provided with a month's pay, advanced locally and repaid within six months. Any regiment of militia would be liable to serve throughout the country.

== Subsequent developments ==
The whole act was repealed by section 1 of, and the schedule to, the Statute Law Revision Act 1867 (30 & 31 Vict. c. 59), which came into force on 15 July 1867.
