= List of acts of the Parliament of Great Britain from 1745 =

This is a complete list of acts of the Parliament of Great Britain for the year 1745.

For acts passed until 1707, see the list of acts of the Parliament of England and the list of acts of the Parliament of Scotland. See also the list of acts of the Parliament of Ireland.

For acts passed from 1801 onwards, see the list of acts of the Parliament of the United Kingdom. For acts of the devolved parliaments and assemblies in the United Kingdom, see the list of acts of the Scottish Parliament, the list of acts of the Northern Ireland Assembly, and the list of acts and measures of Senedd Cymru; see also the list of acts of the Parliament of Northern Ireland.

The number shown after each act's title is its chapter number. Acts are cited using this number, preceded by the year(s) of the reign during which the relevant parliamentary session was held; thus the Union with Ireland Act 1800 is cited as "39 & 40 Geo. 3. c. 67", meaning the 67th act passed during the session that started in the 39th year of the reign of George III and which finished in the 40th year of that reign. Note that the modern convention is to use Arabic numerals in citations (thus "41 Geo. 3" rather than "41 Geo. III").

Acts of the last session of the Parliament of Great Britain and the first session of the Parliament of the United Kingdom are both cited as "41 Geo. 3". Acts passed by the Parliament of Great Britain did not have a short title; however, some of these acts have subsequently been given a short title by acts of the Parliament of the United Kingdom (such as the Short Titles Act 1896).

Before the Acts of Parliament (Commencement) Act 1793 came into force on 8 April 1793, acts passed by the Parliament of Great Britain were deemed to have come into effect on the first day of the session in which they were passed. Because of this, the years given in the list below may in fact be the year before a particular act was passed.

== 19 Geo. 2 ==
The fifth session of the 9th Parliament of Great Britain, which met from 17 October 1745 until 12 August 1746.

This session was also traditionally cited as 19 G. 2.

=== Public acts ===
Short title	Citation	Royal assent
Long title
Habeas Corpus Suspension Act 1745 (repealed)	19 Geo. 2. c. 1	21 October 1745
An Act to empower His Majesty to secure and detain such Persons as His Majesty shall suspect are conspiring against His Person and Government. (Repealed by Statute Law Revision Act 1867 (30 & 31 Vict. c. 59))
Militia Act 1745 (repealed)	19 Geo. 2. c. 2	14 November 1745
An Act to raise the Militia of that Part of Great Britain called England, although the Month's Pay formerly advanced hath not yet been re-paid; and to raise such Part of the said Militia as shall be judged most proper, ready, and convenient. (Repealed by Statute Law Revision Act 1867 (30 & 31 Vict. c. 59))
Land Tax Act 1745 (repealed)	19 Geo. 2. c. 3	27 November 1745
An Act for granting an Aid to His Majesty, by a Land Tax, to be raised in Great Britain, for the Service of the Year One Thousand Seven Hundred and Forty-six. (Repealed by Statute Law Revision Act 1867 (30 & 31 Vict. c. 59))
Taxation Act 1745 (repealed)	19 Geo. 2. c. 4	27 November 1745
An Act for continuing the Duties upon Malt, Mum, Cyder, and Perry, in that Part of Great Britain called England; and for granting to His Majesty certain Duties upon Malt, Mum, Cyder, and Perry, in that Part of Great Britain called Scotland; for the Service of the Year One Thousand Seven Hundred and Forty-six. (Repealed by Statute Law Revision Act 1867 (30 & 31 Vict. c. 59))
Distemper Amongst Cattle Act 1745 (repealed)	19 Geo. 2. c. 5	13 February 1746
An Act to enable His Majesty to make Rules, Orders, and Regulations, more effectually to prevent the spreading of the Distemper which now rages amongst the Horned Cattle in this Kingdom. (Repealed by Statute Law Revision Act 1867 (30 & 31 Vict. c. 59))
Bank of England Act 1745 (repealed)	19 Geo. 2. c. 6	13 February 1746
An Act for establishing an Agreement with the Governor and Company of the Bank of England, for canceling certain Exchequer Bills, upon the Terms therein mentioned; and for obliging them to advance the Sum of One Million, upon the Credit of the Land Tax and Malt Duties granted to His Majesty for the Service of the Year One Thousand Seven Hundred and Forty-six. (Repealed by Statute Law Revision Act 1966 (c. 5))
Court of Session (Scotland) Act 1745 (repealed)	19 Geo. 2. c. 7	13 February 1746
An Act for adjourning the Court of Session in Scotland; and for remedying the Inconveniencies arising from the Surcease of Justice in that Part of the Kingdom. (Repealed by Statute Law Revision Act 1867 (30 & 31 Vict. c. 59))
Acts of Common Council, London Act 1745 (repealed)	19 Geo. 2. c. 8	19 March 1746
An Act for repealing so much of an Act passed in the Eleventh Year of the Reign of His late Majesty King George the First, intituled, "An Act for regulating Elections within the City of London; and for preserving the Peace, good Order, and Government, of the said City," (Note: City of London Elections Act 1724 (11 Geo. 1. c. 18)) as relates to the making or passing of Acts, Orders, or Ordinances, in Common Council. (Repealed by Statute Law Revision Act 1867 (30 & 31 Vict. c. 59))
Jurors (Scotland) Act 1745 (repealed)	19 Geo. 2. c. 9	19 March 1746
An Act for the more easy and speedy Trial of such Persons as have levied, or shall levy, War against His Majesty; and for the better ascertaining the Qualifications of Jurors, in Trials for High Treason, or Misprision of Treason, in that Part of Great Britain called Scotland. (Repealed by Treason Act 1945 (8 & 9 Geo. 6. c. 44))
Leicester Roads Act 1745 (repealed)	19 Geo. 2. c. 10	19 March 1746
An Act for enlarging the Term and Powers granted by an Act passed in the Twelfth Year of the Reign of His late Majesty King George the First, (Note: Leicestershire Road Act 1725 (12 Geo. 1. c. 5)) for repairing the Road from Market Harborough to Loughborough, in the County of Leicester; and for making the said Act more effectual. (Repealed by Roads from Market Harborough to Loughborough Act 1830 (11 Geo. 4 & 1 Will. 4. c. iii))
Mutiny Act 1745 (repealed)	19 Geo. 2. c. 11	19 March 1746
An Act for punishing Mutiny and Desertion; and for the better Payment of the Army and their Quarters. (Repealed by Statute Law Revision Act 1867 (30 & 31 Vict. c. 59))
National Debt Act 1745 (repealed)	19 Geo. 2. c. 12	19 March 1746
An Act for granting to His Majesty several Rates and Duties upon Glass, and upon Spirituous Liquors; and for raising a certain Sum of Money, by Annuities and a Lottery, to be charged on the said Rates and Duties; and for obviating some Doubts about making out Orders at the Exchequer, for the Monies advanced upon the Credit of the Salt Duties granted and continued to His Majesty by an Act of the last Session of Parliament. (Note: Salt Duties Act 1744 (18 Geo. 2. c. 5)) (Repealed by Statute Law Revision Act 1870 (33 & 34 Vict. c. 69))
Oaths of Justices of the Peace Act 1745 (repealed)	19 Geo. 2. c. 13	19 March 1746
An Act to enlarge the Time for Justices of the Peace to take and subscribe the Oath directed by an Act made in the last Session of Parliament, (Note: Justices Qualification Act 1744 (18 Geo. 2. c. 20)) intituled, "An Act to render and make more effectual an Act passed in the Fifth Year of His present Majesty's Reign, (Note: Justices Qualification Act 1731 (5 Geo. 2. c. 18)) intituled, 'An Act for the further Qualification of Justices of the Peace.'" (Repealed by Statute Law Revision Act 1867 (30 & 31 Vict. c. 59))
Coinage Duties Act 1745 (repealed)	19 Geo. 2. c. 14	19 March 1746
An Act to continue the Duties for Encouragement of the Coinage of Money. (Repealed by Statute Law Revision Act 1867 (30 & 31 Vict. c. 59))
Bethnal Green (Completion of Church and Poor Relief) Act 1745 (repealed)	19 Geo. 2. c. 15	19 March 1746
An Act for enabling the Inhabitants of the Hamlet of Bethnal Green, in the County of Midd'x, to compleat their Church, and to pay Debts already contracted for the Relief of the Poor of the said Parish. (Repealed by Statute Law (Repeals) Act 2013 (c. 2))
Papists Act 1745 (repealed)	19 Geo. 2. c. 16	19 April 1746
An Act for allowing further Time for Enrolment of Deeds and Wills made by Papists; and for Relief of Protestant Purchasers, Devisees, and Lessees. (Repealed by Statute Law Revision Act 1867 (30 & 31 Vict. c. 59))
Habeas Corpus Suspension (No. 2) Act 1745 (repealed)	19 Geo. 2. c. 17	19 April 1746
An Act for continuing an Act of this present Session of Parliament, intituled, "An Act to empower His Majesty to secure and detain such Persons as His Majesty shall suspect are conspiring against His Person and Government." (Note: Habeas Corpus Suspension Act 1745 (19 Geo. 2. c. 1)) (Repealed by Statute Law Revision Act 1867 (30 & 31 Vict. c. 59))
Gloucester Roads Act 1745 (repealed)	19 Geo. 2. c. 18	19 April 1746
An Act for enlarging the Term and Powers granted by an Act passed in the Twelfth Year of the Reign of His late Majesty King George the First, (Note: Gloucestershire Roads Act 1725 (12 Geo. 1. c. 24)) for repairing the Road from the City of Gloucester to Stone, and other Roads therein mentioned; and for making the said Act more effectual. (Repealed by Statute Law (Repeals) Act 2013 (c. 2))
Lancashire Roads Act 1745 (repealed)	19 Geo. 2. c. 19	4 June 1746
An Act for enlarging the Term and Powers granted by an Act passed in the Twelfth Year of the Reign of His late Majesty King George the First, (Note: Liverpool to Prescot Road Act 1725 (12 Geo. 1. c. 21)) for repairing and enlarging the Road from Liverpool to Prescot, and other Roads therein mentioned, in the County Palatine of Lancaster; and for amending the Road leading from Prescot to the Chapel of Saint Helen, in the said County. (Repealed by Lancaster Roads Act 1771 (11 Geo. 3. c. 91))
Indemnity Act 1745 (repealed)	19 Geo. 2. c. 20	4 June 1746
An Act to indemnify such Persons as have acted in Defence of His Majesty's Person and Government, and for the Preservation of the Public Peace of the Kingdom, during the Time of the present unnatural Rebellion; and Sheriffs and others, who have suffered Escapes occasioned thereby, from vexatious Suits and Prosecutions. (Repealed by Statute Law Revision Act 1867 (30 & 31 Vict. c. 59))
Profane Oaths Act 1745 (repealed)	19 Geo. 2. c. 21	4 June 1746
An Act more effectually to prevent profane Cursing and Swearing. (Repealed by Criminal Law Act 1967 (c. 58))
Harbours Act 1745 (repealed)	19 Geo. 2. c. 22	4 June 1746
An Act for the better Preservation of Havens, Roads, Channels, and Navigable Rivers, within that Part of Great Britain called England. (Repealed by Statute Law Revision Act 1948 (11 & 12 Geo. 6. c. 62))
Growth of Coffee Act 1745 (repealed)	19 Geo. 2. c. 23	4 June 1746
An Act to continue Two Acts of Parliament; One, (Note: Growth of Coffee Act 1731 (5 Geo. 2. c. 24)) for encouraging the Growth of Coffee in His Majesty's Plantations in America; and the other, (Note: Trade of Sugar Colonies Act 1732 (6 Geo. 2. c. 13)) for the better securing and encouraging the Trade of His Majesty's Sugar Colonies in America. (Repealed by Statute Law Revision Act 1867 (30 & 31 Vict. c. 59))
Dorchester Bridge and Causeway Act 1745	19 Geo. 2. c. 24	4 June 1746
An Act to empower Lora Pitt Widow to erect a Bridge, or Bridges, over the River Froome; and to make a Causeway to the East End of the Town of Dorchester, over Forthington Moor, in the County of Dorset.
Suspected Persons (Scotland) Act 1745 (repealed)	19 Geo. 2. c. 25	4 June 1746
An Act for calling any suspected Person or Persons, whose Estates or principal Residence are in Scotland, to appear at Edinburgh, or where it shall be judged expedient, to find Bail for their good Behaviour. (Repealed by Statute Law Revision Act 1867 (30 & 31 Vict. c. 59))
Attainder of Earl of Kellie and Others Act 1745 (repealed)	19 Geo. 2. c. 26	4 June 1746
An Act to attaint Alexander Earl of Kellie, (Note: Alexander Erskine, 5th Earl of Kellie.) William Viscount of Strathallan, (Note: William Drummond, 4th Viscount Strathallan.) Alexander Lord Pitsligo, (Note: Alexander Forbes, 4th Lord Forbes of Pitsligo.) David Wemyss Esquire commonly called Lord Elcho Eldest Son and Heir Apparent of James Earl of Wemyss, (Note: David Wemyss, Lord Elcho.) James Drummond Esquire Eldest Son and Heir Apparent of William Viscount of Strathallan, (Note: James Drummond, de jure 5th Viscount Strathallan.) Simon Fraser Esquire Eldest Son and Heir Apparent of Simon Lord Lovat, (Note: Simon Fraser of Lovat.) George Murray Esquire commonly called Lord George Murray Brother to James Duke of Athol, (Note: George Murray (general).) Lewis Gordon Esquire commonly called Lord Lewis Gordon Brother to Cosmo George Duke of Gordon, (Note: Lewis Gordon (Jacobite).) James Drummond taking upon himself the Title of Duke of Perth, (Note: James Drummond, 3rd Duke of Perth.) James Graham late of Duntroon taking on himself the Title of Viscount of Dundee, (Note: James Graham, titular 6th Viscount of Dundee.) John Nairn taking upon himself the Title or Style of Lord Nairn, (Note: John Nairne, de jure 3rd Lord Nairne.) David Ogilvie taking upon himself the Title of Lord Ogilvie, (Note: David Ogilvy, 6th Earl of Airlie.) John Drummond, taking upon himself the Style or Title of Lord John Drummond Brother to James Drummond taking on himself the Title of Duke of Perth, (Note: John Drummond, 1st Earl of Melfort.) Robert Mercer Esquire otherwise Nairn of Aldie, Sir William Gordon of Park, John Murray of Broughton Esquire, (Note: John Murray of Broughton.) John Gordon the Elder of Glenbuckett, Donald Cameron the Younger of Lochiel, (Note: Donald Cameron of Lochiel.) Doctor Archibald Cameron Brother to Donald Cameron the Younger of Lochiel, (Note: Archibald Cameron of Lochiel.) Ludovick Cameron of Tor Castle, Alexander Cameron of Dungallon, Donald Mac Donald of Clanronald Junior Son to Rhonald Mac Donald of Clanronald, Donald Mac Donald of Lochgarie, Alexander Mac Donald of Keppoch, Archibald Mac Donald Son of Col. Mac Donald of Barisdale, Alexander Mac Donald of Glencoe, Evan Mac Pherson of Clunie, Lauchlan Mac Lauchlan of Castle Lauchlan, John Mac Kinnon of Mac Kinnon, Charles Stewart of Ardsheil, George Lockhart Eldest Son and Heir Apparent of George Lockhart of Carnwath, Lawrence Oliphant the Elder of Gask, Lawrence Oliphant the Younger of Gask, (Note: Laurence Oliphant (Jacobite).) James Graham the Younger of Airth, John Stewart commonly called John Roy Stewart, Francis Farquharson of Monalterye, Alexander Mac Gilivrae of Drumaglash, Lauchlan Mac Intosh Merchant at Inverness, Malcolm Ross Son of Alexander Ross of Pitcalny, Alexander Mac Leod Son to Master John Mac Leod Advocate, John Hay Portioner of Restalrig Writer to the Signet, Andrew Lumsdale otherwise Lumsdain Son to William Lumsdale otherwise Lumsdain Writer in Edinburgh, and William Fidler Clerk in the Auditor's Office in the Exchequer of Scotland, of High Treason, if they shall not render themselves to One of His Majesty's Justices of the Peace on or before the Twelfth Day of July in the Year of our Lord One Thousand Seven Hundred and Forty-six, and submit to Justice. (Repealed by Statute Law (Repeals) Act 1977 (c. 18))
Sail Cloth Act 1745 (repealed)	19 Geo. 2. c. 27	4 June 1746
An Act for the more effectual securing the Duties now payable on Foreign-made Sail Cloth imported into this Kingdom; and for charging all Foreign made Sails with a Duty; and for explaining a Doubt concerning Ships being obliged, at their first setting out to Sea, to be furnished with One complete Set of Sails made of British Sail Cloth. (Repealed by Statute Law Revision Act 1867 (30 & 31 Vict. c. 59))
Parliamentary Elections Act 1745 (repealed)	19 Geo. 2. c. 28	4 June 1746
An Act for the better regulating of Elections of Members to serve in Parliament, for such Cities and Towns, in that Part of Great Britain called England, as are Counties of themselves. (Repealed by Statute Law Revision Act 1867 (30 & 31 Vict. c. 59), Ballot Act 1872 (35 & 36 Vict. c. 33) and Representation of the People Act 1918 (7 & 8 Geo. 5. c. 64))
Provision for the Duke of Cumberland Act 1745 (repealed)	19 Geo. 2. c. 29	4 June 1746
An Act for settling an additional Revenue of Twenty-five Thousand Pounds upon his Royal Highness William Duke of Cumberland, and the Heirs Males of his Body, for the signal Services done by his Royal Highness to his Country. (Repealed by Statute Law Revision Act 1867 (30 & 31 Vict. c. 59))
Sugar Trade Act 1745 (repealed)	19 Geo. 2. c. 30	4 June 1746
An Act for the better Encouragement of the Trade of His Majesty's Sugar Colonies in America. (Repealed by Naval Prize Acts Repeal Act 1864 (27 & 28 Vict. c. 23))
Supply, etc. Act 1745 (repealed)	19 Geo. 2. c. 31	12 August 1746
An Act for granting to His Majesty a certain Sum of Money out of the Sinking Fund, for the Service of the Year One Thousand Seven Hundred and Forty-six; and also for enabling His Majesty to raise a further Sum of Money, for the Uses and Purposes therein mentioned; and for the further appropriating the Supplies granted in this Session of Parliament; and for making forth Duplicates of Exchequer Bills, Lottery Tickets, Receipts, Annuity Orders, or other Orders, lost, burnt, or otherwise destroyed. (Repealed by Statute Law Revision Act 1867 (30 & 31 Vict. c. 59))
Bankrupts Act 1745 (repealed)	19 Geo. 2. c. 32	12 August 1746
An Act for amending the Laws relating to Bankrupts. (Repealed by Bankruptcy Act 1825 (6 Geo. 4. c. 16))
Indemnity (No. 2) Act 1745 (repealed)	19 Geo. 2. c. 33	12 August 1746
An Act to indemnify Persons who have omitted to qualify themselves for Offices, Employments, and Promotions, within the Time limited by Law; and for allowing further Time for that Purpose. (Repealed by Statute Law Revision Act 1867 (30 & 31 Vict. c. 59))
Offences against Customs or Excise Act 1745 (repealed)	19 Geo. 2. c. 34	12 August 1746
An Act for the further Punishment of Persons going armed or disguised, in Defiance of the Laws of Customs or Excise; and for indemnifying Offenders against those Laws, upon the Terms in this Act mentioned; and for the Relief of Officers of the Customs, in Informations upon Seizures. (Repealed by Statute Law Revision Act 1867 (30 & 31 Vict. c. 59))
Coal Trade (London) Act 1745 (repealed)	19 Geo. 2. c. 35	12 August 1746
An Act more effectually to prevent the Frauds and Abuses committed in the Admeasurement of Coals, within the City and Liberty of Westminster, and that Part of the Dutchy of Lancaster adjoining thereto, and the several Parishes of Saint Giles in the Fields, Saint Mary le Bon, and such Part of the Parish of Saint Andrew Holborn as lies in the County of Middlesex. (Repealed by Westminster Coal Trade Act 1786 (26 Geo. 3. c. 108))
Naval Stores Act 1745 (repealed)	19 Geo. 2. c. 36	12 August 1746
An Act to allow the Purchase, for His Majesty's Use, of Naval Stores brought into this Kingdom on Board Neutral Ships, by any of His Majesty's Ships; and to allow such Stores to be landed and entered, during the Continuance of the present War with France and Spain, or either of them. (Repealed by Statute Law Revision Act 1867 (30 & 31 Vict. c. 59))
Marine Insurance Act 1745 (repealed)	19 Geo. 2. c. 37	12 August 1746
An Act to regulate Insurance on Ships belonging to the Subjects of Great Britain, and on Merchandizes or Effects laden thereon. (Repealed by Marine Insurance Act 1906 (6 Edw. 7. c. 41))
Episcopal Meeting Houses (Scotland) Act 1745 or the Toleration Act 1746 or the Penal Act 1746 (repealed)	19 Geo. 2. c. 38	12 August 1746
An Act more effectually to prohibit and prevent Pastors or Ministers from officiating in Episcopal Meeting-houses in Scotland, without duly qualifying themselves according to Law; and to punish Persons for resorting to any Meeting-houses where such unqualified Pastors or Ministers shall officiate. (Repealed by Statute Law Revision Act 1867 (30 & 31 Vict. c. 59))
Disarming the Highlands, etc. Act 1745 or the Act of Proscription 1746 or the Disarming Act 1746 or the Dress Act 1746 (repealed)	19 Geo. 2. c. 39	12 August 1746
An Act for the more effectual disarming The Highlands in Scotland; and for more effectually securing the Peace of the said Highlands; and for restraining the Use of the Highland Dress; and for further indemnifying such Persons as have acted in Defence of His Majesty's Person and Government during the unnatural Rebellion; and for indemnifying the Judges and other Officers of the Court of Justiciary in Scotland, for not performing the Northern Circuit in May One Thousand Seven Hundred and Forty-six; and for obliging the Masters and Teachers of private Schools in Scotland, and Chaplains, Tutors and Governors of Children or Youth, to take the Oaths to His Majesty, His Heirs and Successors; and to register the same. (Repealed by Promissory Oaths Act 1871 (34 & 35 Vict. c. 48))

=== Private acts ===
Short title	Citation	Royal assent
Long title
Vincent's Estate Act 1745	19 Geo. 2. c. 1 Pr.	13 February 1746
An Act for empowering Francis Vincent Esquire to make a Jointure on any future Marriage, and Provision for his Daughters and Younger Sons.
Knatchbull's Name Act 1745	19 Geo. 2. c. 2 Pr.	13 February 1746
An Act to enable Sir Wyndham Knatchbull Baronet and his Heirs Male to take and use the Surname and Arms of Wyndham, pursuant to the Desire of Thomas Lord Wyndham in the Kingdom of Ireland, deceased.
Enabling Richard Alie and his heirs male to take the surname Leman pursuant to the will of Sir William Leman.	19 Geo. 2. c. 3 Pr.	13 February 1746
An Act to enable Richard Leman Esquire, formerly called Richard Alie, and the Heirs Male of his Body, to take and use the Surname of Leman, pursuant to the Will of Sir William Leman Baronet, deceased.
Naturalizing Hermann Meyer, Herman Klincke and Peter Torras Junior Act 1745	19 Geo. 2. c. 4 Pr.	13 February 1746
An Act for naturalizing Herman Meyer, Herman Rudolphe Klincke, and Peter Torras.
Dreyer's Naturalization Act 1745	19 Geo. 2. c. 5 Pr.	13 February 1746
An Act for naturalizing John Daniel Dreyer.
Grimston's Estate Act 1745	19 Geo. 2. c. 6 Pr.	19 March 1746
An Act for giving Power to the Sons of William Lord Viscount Grimston to make Jointures, on their respective Marriages, in Lieu of a defective Power contained in the Settlement made on the Marriage of Samuel Grimston Esquire, deceased.
D'Aeth's Estate Act 1745	19 Geo. 2. c. 7 Pr.	19 March 1746
An Act to vest the Manor of Ruxley, in the County of Kent, and several Lands there, in Sir Narbrough D'Aeth Baronet and his Heirs, discharged of the Uses in his Marriage Settlement; other Lands in the said County, of greater Value, being settled in Lieu thereof.
Inkpen Inclosure Act 1745	19 Geo. 2. c. 8 Pr.	19 March 1746
An Act for confirming and establishing Articles of Agreement, and an Award, for enclosing and dividing certain Common Fields, within the Parish of Inkpen, in the County of Berks.
Ripon, Littlethorpe and Bondgate (Yorkshire) Common Right Act 1745	19 Geo. 2. c. 9 Pr.	19 March 1746
An Act for giving further Time to execute an Act, made in the Seventeenth Year of His present Majesty, intituled, "An Act for extinguishing a Right of Common claimed by, and belonging to, the Owners and Proprietors of ancient Burgages and Tenements in Ripon, Littlethorpe, and Bondgate, in the County of York; and for settling and providing an Equivalent for the said Common Right." (Note: Ripon, &c. Inclosure Act 1743 (17 Geo. 2. c. 37 Pr.))
Kelfield Inclosure Act 1745	19 Geo. 2. c. 10 Pr.	19 March 1746
An Act for establishing Articles of Agreement, for an Enclosure and Division of the Common Fields, Wastes, and Common Grounds, in the Manor of Kelfield, in the County of York; and for empowering the Lord of the Manor to raise Money, to compleat the said Enclosure.
Rolt's Estate Act 1745	19 Geo. 2. c. 11 Pr.	19 March 1746
An Act for rectifying and amending the Defects in a former Act of Parliament, made in the Fifteenth Year of the Reign of His present Majesty, (Note: Rolt's Estate Act 1741 (15 Geo. 2. c. 44 Pr.)) for Sale of Part of the Estate of Edward Bayntun Rolt Esquire; and for the better and more effectual Execution of the Trusts in the said former Act.
Duke of Leeds' Estate Act 1745	19 Geo. 2. c. 12 Pr.	19 April 1746
An Act for Sale of Part of the Estate of Thomas Duke of Leeds; and for applying Part of the Money arising thereby in the Payment of certain Debts owing by him, and the Residue in Discharge of Encumbrances affecting the rest of the said Duke's settled Estates; and for securing an Equivalent to his Issue Male, in respect of what should be so applied in Payment of the said Debts.
Hart's Estate Act 1745	19 Geo. 2. c. 13 Pr.	19 April 1746
An Act for vesting in Simon Lord Viscount Harcourt certain Lands in Ducklington, in the County of Oxford, discharged from the Trusts limited in the Marriage Settlement of George Hart with Susanna his now Wife; and for purchasing other Lands, to be settled in Lieu thereof.
Wright's Estate Act 1745	19 Geo. 2. c. 14 Pr.	19 April 1746
An Act for vesting the Real and Leasehold Estates late of Edward Wright Esquire, deceased, in Trustees, to be sold, for Payment of his Debts, and other Purposes.
Crabb's Name Act 1745	19 Geo. 2. c. 15 Pr.	19 April 1746
An Act to enable Henry Crabb and his Heirs Male to take and use the Surname of Boulton, pursuant to the Will of Richard Boulton Esquire, deceased.
Duke of Chandos' Estate Act 1745	19 Geo. 2. c. 16 Pr.	4 June 1746
An Act for vesting Part of the settled Estates of the most Noble Henry Duke of Chandos in Trustees, for raising Money, to discharge Encumbrances affecting other Parts thereof, and for Payment of his Debts; and for securing an Equivalent to the Right Honourable James Brydges, called Marquis of Carnarvon, an Infant, and his Issue; and for raising, at Twenty-one or Marriage, the Portion charged on the said settled Estates for the Lady Caroline Brydges, only Daughter of the said Duke, and for securing to her the Interest thereof in the mean Time.
Earl of Plymouth's Estate Act 1745	19 Geo. 2. c. 17 Pr.	4 June 1746
An Act to empower the Guardians of Other Lewis Earl of Plimouth, an Infant, to make Leases of his Estate in the County of Glamorgan, during his Minority.
Earl of Cholmondeley and William Pitt's Oaths of Office Act 1745	19 Geo. 2. c. 18 Pr.	4 June 1746
An Act to enable George Earl Cholmondeley and William Pitt Esquire to take, in Great Britain, the Oath of Office, as Vice Treasurer and Receiver General and Paymaster General of all His Majesty's Revenues in the Kingdom of Ireland; and to qualify themselves for the Enjoyment of the said Offices.
Earl of Fingall's Estate Act 1745	19 Geo. 2. c. 19 Pr.	4 June 1746
An Act for Sale of certain Estates of the late Earl of Fingall, in the County of Cavan, in the Kingdom of Ireland, for discharging Encumbrances charged thereon; and for other Purposes therein mentioned.
Lechmere's Estate Act 1745	19 Geo. 2. c. 20 Pr.	4 June 1746
An Act for Sale of the Estate late of Richard Lechmere Junior and Anne his Wife, in the County of Essex, pursuant to Articles entered into for the Purchase thereof; and for applying the Money arising by such Sale for discharging Encumbrances affecting the said Estate; and for other Purposes therein mentioned.
Manner's Estate Act 1745	19 Geo. 2. c. 21 Pr.	4 June 1746
An Act for vesting divers Lands and Tenements in the County of Northumberland, late the Estate of John Manners Gentleman, deceased, in Trustees, to enable them to make an effectual Conveyance thereof to the Purchasers under a Decree of the Court of Chancery, for the Purposes therein mentioned.
Sill's Estate Act 1745	19 Geo. 2. c. 22 Pr.	4 June 1746
An Act for Sale of certain Houses and Tenements in Wakefield, in the County of York, Part of the settled Estate of Joseph Sill, Gentleman, for discharging a Bond Debt therein mentioned.
Ramsden's Name Act 1745	19 Geo. 2. c. 23 Pr.	4 June 1746
An Act to enable Walter Hawksworth Esquire, formerly called Walter Ramsden, and the Heirs of his Body, to take and use the Surname of Hawksworth, pursuant to the Will of Sir Walter Hawksworth Baronet, deceased.
Baur's Naturalization Act 1745	19 Geo. 2. c. 24 Pr.	4 June 1746
An Act for naturalizing Michael Baur.
Pellet's Naturalization Act 1745	19 Geo. 2. c. 25 Pr.	4 June 1746
An Act for naturalizing John Baptist Pellet.
Labelye's Naturalization Act 1745	19 Geo. 2. c. 26 Pr.	4 June 1746
An Act for naturalizing Charles Labelye.
Earl of Cholmondeley and Sir William Yonge's Oaths of Office Act 1745	19 Geo. 2. c. 27 Pr.	12 August 1746
An Act to enable George Earl of Cholmondeley and Sir William Yonge Baronet, Knight of the most Honourable Order of the Bath, to take, in Great Britain, the Oath of Office as Vice Treasurer and Receiver General and Paymaster General of all His Majesty's Revenues in the Kingdom of Ireland; and to qualify themselves for the Enjoyment of the said Offices.
Duckinfield's Name Act 1745	19 Geo. 2. c. 28 Pr.	12 August 1746
An Act to enable Sir William Duckinfield Daniel Baronet to take and use the Surname, and bear the Arms, of Daniel, pursuant to the Will of Sir Samuel Daniel Knight, deceased.
Bennet's Estate Act 1745	19 Geo. 2. c. 29 Pr.	12 August 1746
An Act for Sale of divers Lands and Hereditaments in the Counties of Suffolk and Middlesex, entailed on the Daughters of Thomas Bennet Esquire, in order to raise a Sum of Money in present for their Portions, as an Equivalent for their Reversionary Interest in the said Estates, expectant on the Death of their Father.
Exchange of an estate in Putney (Surrey) held in trust for charitable uses for an estate of Gerard Van Neck in Hertfordshire and payment of a sum to the trustees to be applied to the same uses.	19 Geo. 2. c. 30 Pr.	12 August 1746
An Act for the Exchange of an Estate in Putney, in the County of Surrey, held in Trust for charitable Uses, for another Estate of Gerard Van Neck Esquire, in the County of Hertford; and for Payment of a Sum of Money to the Trustees, to be applied to the like Uses.
Carmichael's Estate Act 1745	19 Geo. 2. c. 31 Pr.	12 August 1746
An Act to enable Daniel Carmichael of Mauldsley, or the succeeding Heirs of Entail, to sell Lands in the Counties of Lanark and Fife, for Payment of Debts charged thereupon; and to purchase other Lands, to be settled to the same Uses as the Estate to be sold is settled.

=== Sources ===
- Pickering, Danby, ed. (1765). The Statutes at Large. Vol. 18: From the 15th to the 20th Year of King George II. Cambridge: Joseph Bentham. pp. 397–531 – via Internet Archive.
- Pickering, Danby, ed. (1765). The Statutes at Large. Vol. 18: From the 15th to the 20th Year of King George II. Cambridge: Joseph Bentham. pp. 397–531 – via Google Books.
- Journals of the House of Commons. Vol. 25. London: His Majesty's Stationery Office. 1803. pp. 3–188 – via Google Books.
- Chronological Table of and Index to the Statutes. Vol. 1: To the End of the Session 59 Vict. Sess. 2 (1895) (13th ed.). London: Her Majesty's Stationery Office. 1896. pp. 109–110 – via Google Books.

== See also ==
- List of acts of the Parliament of Great Britain
