= Attainder of Earl of Kellie and Others Act 1745 =

Act of the Parliament of Great Britain

- Act of Parliament
- Parliament of Great Britain
- Long title: An Act to attaint Alexander Earl of Kellie, William Viscount of Strathallan, Alexander Lord Pitsligo, David Wemyss Esquire commonly called Lord Elcho Eldest Son and Heir Apparent of James Earl of Wemyss, James Drummond Esquire Eldest Son and Heir Apparent of William Viscount of Strathallan, Simon Fraser Esquire Eldest Son and Heir Apparent of Simon Lord Lovat, George Murray Esquire commonly called Lord George Murray Brother to James Duke of Athol, Lewis Gordon Esquire commonly called Lord Lewis Gordon Brother to Cosmo George Duke of Gordon, James Drummond taking upon himself the Title of Duke of Perth, James Graham late of Duntroon taking on himself the Title of Viscount of Dundee, John Nairn taking upon himself the Title or Style of Lord Nairn, David Ogilvie taking upon himself the Title of Lord Ogilvie, John Drummond, taking upon himself the Style or Title of Lord John Drummond Brother to James Drummond taking on himself the Title of Duke of Perth, Robert Mercer Esquire otherwise Nairn of Aldie, Sir William Gordon of Park, John Murray of Broughton Esquire, John Gordon the Elder of Glenbuckett, Donald Cameron the Younger of Lochiel, Doctor Archibald Cameron Brother to Donald Cameron the Younger of Lochiel, Ludovick Cameron of Tor Castle, Alexander Cameron of Dungallon, Donald Mac Donald of Clanronald Junior Son to Rhonald Mac Donald of Clanronald, Donald Mac Donald of Lochgarie, Alexander Mac Donald of Keppoch, Archibald Mac Donald Son of Col. Mac Donald of Barisdale, Alexander Mac Donald of Glencoe, Evan Mac Pherson of Clunie, Lauchlan Mac Lauchlan of Castle Lauchlan, John Mac Kinnon of Mac Kinnon, Charles Stewart of Ardsheil, George Lockhart Eldest Son and Heir Apparent of George Lockhart of Carnwath, Lawrence Oliphant the Elder of Gask, Lawrence Oliphant the Younger of Gask, James Graham the Younger of Airth, John Stewart commonly called John Roy Stewart, Francis Farquharson of Monalterye, Alexander Mac Gilivrae of Drumaglash, Lauchlan Mac Intosh Merchant at Inverness, Malcolm Ross Son of Alexander Ross of Pitcalny, Alexander Mac Leod Son to Master John Mac Leod Advocate, John Hay Portioner of Restalrig Writer to the Signet, Andrew Lumsdale otherwise Lumsdain Son to William Lumsdale otherwise Lumsdain Writer in Edinburgh, and William Fidler Clerk in the Auditor's Office in the Exchequer of Scotland, of High Treason, if they shall not render themselves to One of His Majesty's Justices of the Peace on or before the Twelfth Day of July in the Year of our Lord One Thousand Seven Hundred and Forty-six, and submit to Justice.
- Citation: 19 Geo. 2. c. 26
- Territorial extent: Great Britain

Dates
- Royal assent: 4 June 1746
- Commencement: 17 October 1745 (Note: Start of session.)
- Repealed: 16 June 1977
Other legislation
Repealed by	Statute Law (Repeals) Act 1977
Relates to	Habeas Corpus Suspension Act 1745

Status: Repealed

Text of statute as originally enacted

The Attainder of Earl of Kellie and Others Act 1745 (19 Geo. 2. c. 26) was an act of the Parliament of Great Britain. The act was a parliamentary response to the failed Jacobite rising of 1745.

By this act, the Earl of Kellie and others numbering upwards of three dozen who did not surrender themselves by 12 July 1746 were attainted of high treason. Justices of the realm were under this act instructed to commit the persons who surrendered, and to give notice to a Secretary of State.

== Subsequent developments ==
The whole act was repealed by section 1(1) of, and part IV of schedule 1 to, the Statute Law (Repeals) Act 1977, which came into force on 16 June 1977.
