= Maria Gisborne =

British letter writer

Maria Gisborne (née James, previously Reveley; 1770–1836) was a friend and correspondent of Mary and Percy Bysshe Shelley, and William Godwin.

== Early life ==
Maria James, the daughter of an English merchant at Constantinople, was born in 1770, probably in England. When she was eight years old, her mother, who had been left in poverty, determined to rejoin her husband and sailed for Constantinople, only to discover that James had established a new household with the wife of one of his skippers. He persuaded his wife to return to England by promising an annuity, but had Maria kidnapped and concealed until her mother's departure. He subsequently brought her up with care, and gave her a good education. She showed a talent for painting, and grew up a beautiful and accomplished woman. Mary Shelley later hinted at sexual precocity, writing of Maria's upbringing that "she was left to run wild as she might, and at a very early age had gone through the romance of life". Jeremy Bentham met her at her father's house in Constantinople in 1785, accompanied her on the violin, and said that she was the only woman he had met who could keep time. Not long afterwards, she and her father moved to Rome.

== Marriage to Willey Reveley ==
In about 1788, Maria married Willey Reveley, an architect who had been travelling in Greece to make sketches for Sir Richard Worsley. He contributed some views of the Levant to the Museum Worsleyanum (1794), the catalogue of Worsley's collections; and, also in 1794, edited the third volume of James Stuart's Antiquities of Athens. Maria's father was opposed to the marriage and refused to help the couple financially, and they returned to England, where they lived on an income of £140 a year.

There were two children of the marriage, born before Maria was twenty: one was Henry Willey Reveley, who later became an engineer in Cape Town and Western Australia; the name of the other is not known. Willey Reveley was a strong liberal, and became a friend of William Godwin and Thomas Holcroft. About 1791 he received his first professional fee as an architect, £10, for assisting Bentham in preparing drawings for his Panopticon scheme. However, he died suddenly on 6 July 1799 from the rupture of a blood-vessel on the brain.

== Marriage to John Gisborne ==
Within a month of Reveley's death, Maria had received an offer of marriage from Godwin, whose children she had taken into her house on the death of his first wife, Mary Wollstonecraft, in 1797. She refused him, however, and in May 1800 married John Gisborne, a businessman.

The Gisbornes went to Rome in 1801, taking with them Maria's son, Henry. They moved to Livorno in about 1815, where John Gisborne tried, without success, to establish a business: on its failure he settled down as a quiet student. They paid occasional return visits to England.

Through the Godwins, they became acquainted with Mary and Percy Bysshe Shelley, who first visited them at Livorno in 1818. When apart, Maria and Mary remained in contact through correspondence, much of which survives. In 1820 Shelley wrote his beautiful "Letter to Maria Gisborne". It was Maria who introduced Shelley to the work of Pedro Calderón de la Barca.

Maria wrote a short unpublished novel, Mathilda, completed in 1820.

== Later life and death ==
The Gisbornes moved back to England permanently in 1821, and settled at Plymouth: they made just one return visit to Italy in 1827. Both died in Plymouth early in 1836: John Gisborne was buried on 16 January, and Maria Gisborne on the following 23 April.
