= Willey Reveley =

British architect (1760–1799)

Willey Reveley (1760–1799) was an 18th-century English architect, born at Newton Underwood near Morpeth, Northumberland. He was a pupil of Sir William Chambers, and was trained at the Royal Academy Schools. In 1781-2 he was employed (under Chambers) as assistant clerk of works at Somerset House.

Around 1788, Reveley travelled in Greece to make sketches for Sir Richard Worsley. That year, he married Maria James, better known under her later married name of Gisborne as a friend of Mary and Percy Bysshe Shelley. Maria's father opposed the marriage and refused to help the couple financially. They returned to England, where they lived on an income of £140 a year. Their son, Henry Willey Reveley (1788–1875), became a civil engineer and architect in Cape Town and Western Australia. Their other son's name is unknown.

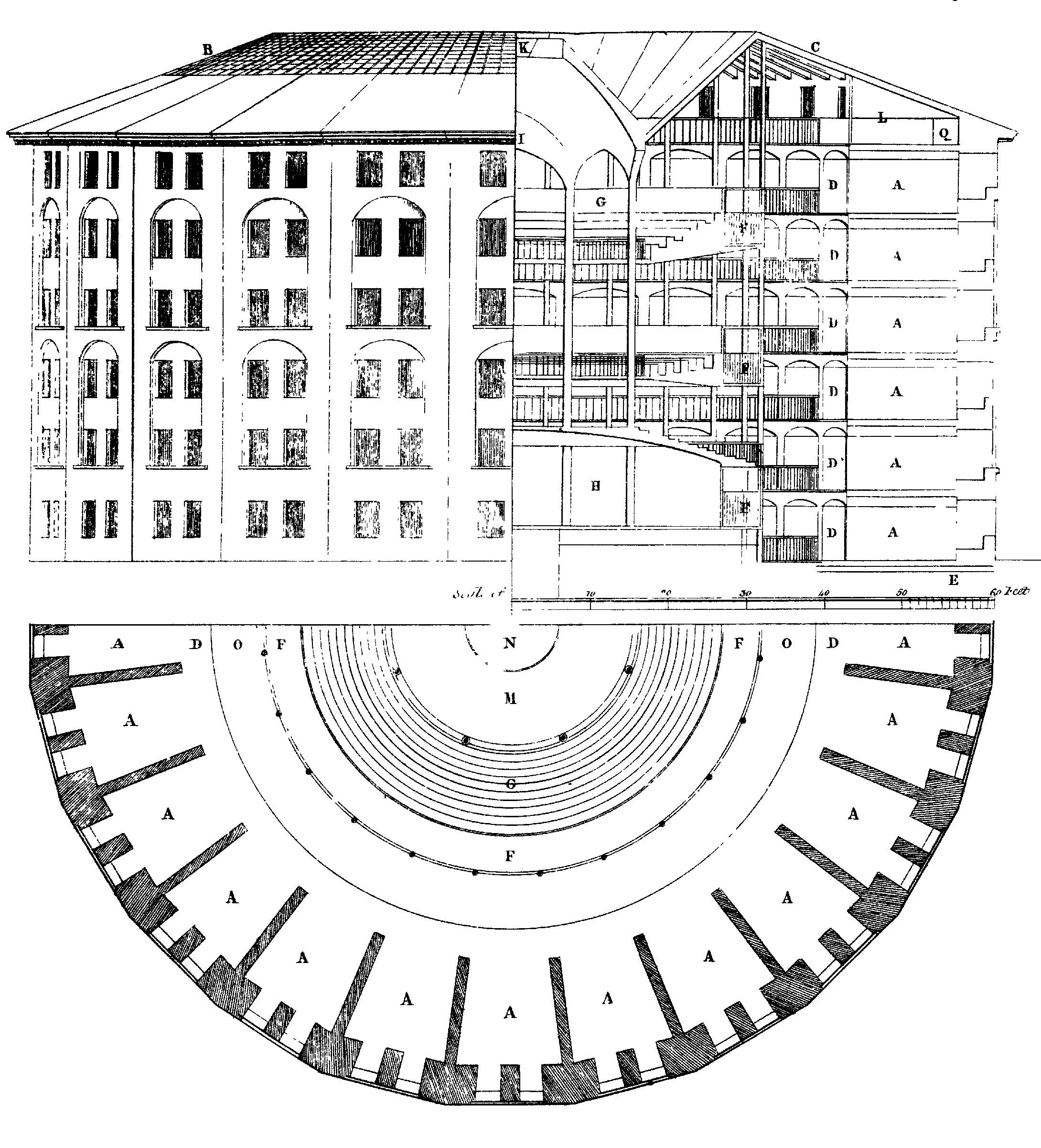
Elevation, section and plan of Jeremy Bentham's Panopticon prison, executed by Reveley, 1791

Reveley was a strong liberal and became a friend of William Godwin and Thomas Holcroft. About 1791 he received his first professional fee as an architect, £10, for assisting philosopher Jeremy Bentham in preparing architectural drawings for Bentham's scheme for a Panopticon prison. Reveley continued to work on the project with Bentham for the rest of the 1790s.

Reveley contributed some views of the Levant to the Museum Worsleyanum (1794), the catalogue of Worsley's collections; and, also in 1794, edited the third volume of James Stuart's Antiquities of Athens.

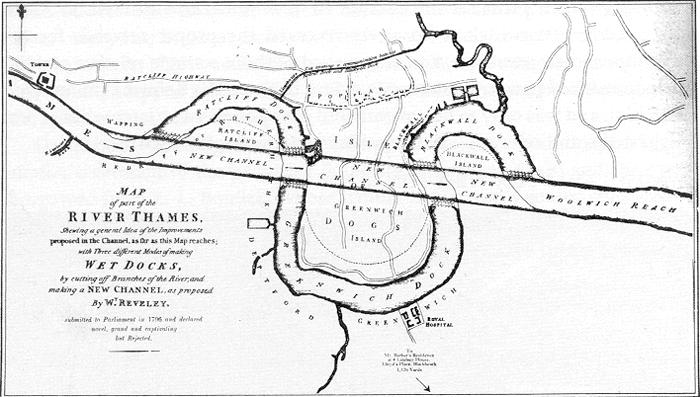
One of Reveley's proposals to straighten the River Thames

In 1796, Reveley made four proposals to straighten the River Thames between Wapping and Woolwich Reach in east London. A new channel across the Rotherhithe, Isle of Dogs and Greenwich peninsulas would reduce the river's length, improve flow to remove pollution, and simplify navigation. Three large horseshoe bends of the river would have been left as huge wet docks, connected to the new channel through locks. Parliament rejected all four proposals.

Like the Thames scheme and the Panopticon prison, Reveley's designs for a public bath complex at Bath and an infirmary at Canterbury did not come to fruition. His completed projects were All Saints' Church, Southampton (constructed 1792–1795, destroyed in 1940); and Windmill Hill, Sussex, a country house built for W. H. Pigou and completed in 1798.

He died on 6 July 1799 "[a]fter a few hours illness".
