= All Saints' Church, Southampton =

Former church building in Southampton, England

All Saints' Church
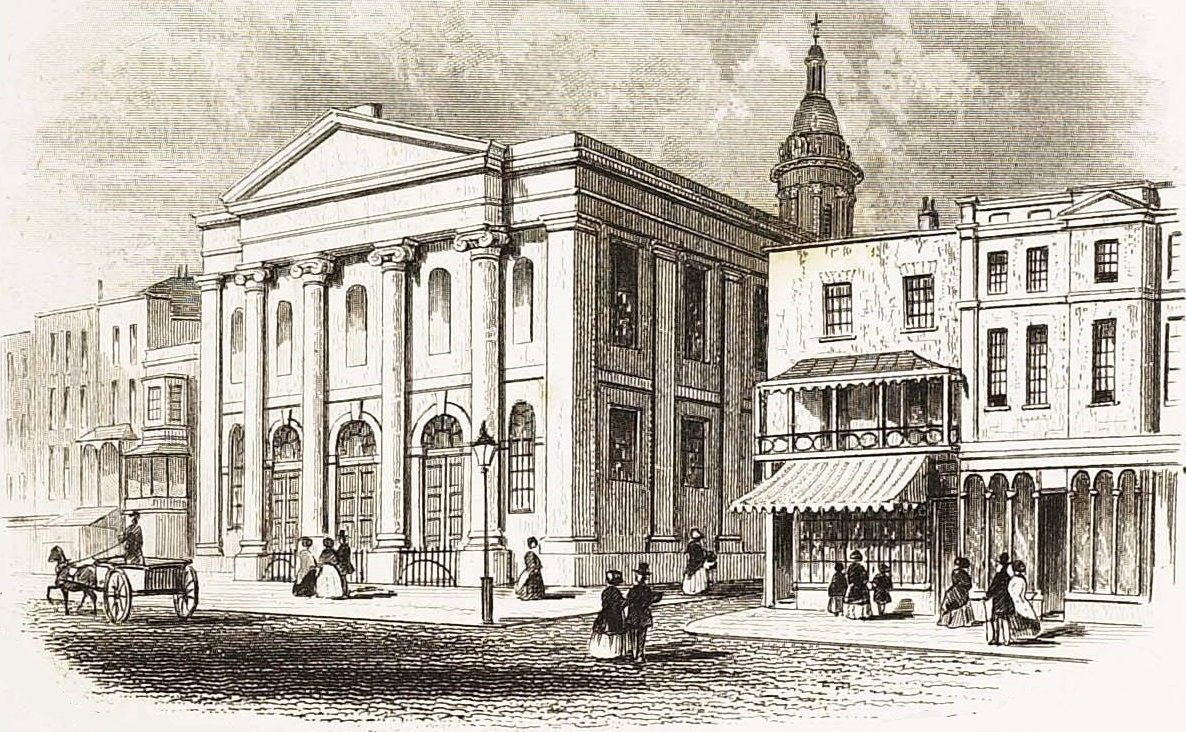
- All Saints' Church with neighbouring shops (and East Street in between) in 1852

- Location within Southampton
- Former names: All Hallows' Church

General information
- Status: Destroyed
- Type: Church
- Location: Southampton City Centre, High Street, Southampton
- Coordinates: 50.90182°N 1.40409°W
- Construction started: Spring 1792
- Completed: 1795
- Destroyed: 30 November / 1 December 1940

Design and construction
- Architect: Willey Reveley

All Saints' Church was a church building in Southampton City Centre, located on the corner of the High Street and East Street, a short distance south of the Bargate.

The original church on the site was named All Hallows, and was constructed in medieval times on land granted by the monarch at the time, Henry II, to the monks of St. Denys Priory. This building fell into disrepair and in the 1790s, a new church building was constructed and the church was renamed All Saints. The old church was demolished in 1791 and the new building was completed in 1795, following two acts of Parliament allowing trustees of the church to raise funds from rates on property and rents in the parish. The All Hallows catacombs were incorporated into the All Saints building, and a separate graveyard was established. The church was regularly attended by author Jane Austen while she lived in Southampton and painter Sir John Everett Millais was baptised there. A new organ was installed in the church in 1861 and a substantial refurbishment programme took place in 1872. All Saints was heavily damaged in the Southampton Blitz and was subsequently demolished.

The All Saints building was designed by architect Willey Reveley and featured an arched ceiling that spanned the whole sanctuary, some 90 feet (27 m) long and 60 feet (18 m) wide, without the use of any supporting pillars. The neoclassical frontage of the church was dominated by four columns supporting Grecian pilasters and a triangular pediment.

The catacombs were the resting place of a chancellor of the Exchequer and two notable Royal Navy officers among others. In August 1944, the remains of all 403 people buried in the catacombs were transferred to a communal grave elsewhere in Southampton.

== History ==
=== 12th to 17th century ===
Henry II, king of England from 1154 to 1189, granted land for the construction of All Hallows' Church to the monks of St. Denys Priory during his reign. The original church, located on the corner of the High Street and East Street, a short distance south of the Bargate, had a chancel and nave with north aisle, and a tower in three stages at its western end. The parish registers date from 1653. The Great Ejection of 1662 led to a number of people being ejected from All Hallows, and these went on to form what would become Above Bar Church and Avenue St Andrew's United Reformed Church. Among their number was the rector of the church at the time, Nathaniel Robinson. The church had five bells, but three of them were stolen one night in September 1682 and never found, despite an award being offered by the Mayor of Southampton, John Speed, in the London Gazette.

=== 18th century ===
All Saints Church, Southampton Act 1791
- Act of Parliament
- Parliament of Great Britain
- Long title: An Act for taking down and re-building the Parish Church of All Saints, within the Town and County of the Town of Southampton, and for purchasing Land for the Purpose of a Church Yard for the Use of the said Parish.
- Citation: 31 Geo. 3. c. 71
- Territorial extent: Great Britain

Dates
- Royal assent: 13 May 1791
- Commencement: 10 August 1790 (Note: Start of session.)
Other legislation
Amended by	All Saints' Church, Southampton Act 1793; All Saints Church, Southampton Act 1797

Status: Amended

Text of statute as originally enacted

By 1791 the medieval church of All Hallows had fallen into disrepair, and an act of the Parliament of the United Kingdom, the All Saints Church, Southampton Act 1791 (31 Geo. 3. c. 71), was passed with provision to demolish the existing structure and rebuild the parish church, and to purchase land for a church yard. The old building, which the Act described as "very ancient, and in a very decayed and ruinous condition", was demolished that year. Work begun on the replacement church, All Saints, in the spring of 1792, with the foundation stone being laid on 3 August that year. In addition to replacing the previous building, a number of neighbouring houses were demolished to make way for the new church.

The building was designed by John Reveley, better known as Willey Reveley, an architect who had been a pupil of Sir William Chambers. Reveley complained in 1795 regarding the late payment of his bills, stating that the committee overseeing the construction of the church owed him £1000. Writing about Reveley's design for All Saints', Dr Frank Salmon of Cambridge University said "the church in Southampton was probably his most important building" and John Nichols, who authored Reveley's obituary in The Gentleman's Magazine, described it as "his principal work". However, in an 1861 history of Hampshire, the building is described as "wholly without interest". Nichols related that the finished building was substantially different from Reveley's original intentions, stating:

His principal work is the New Church at Southampton, which possesses great merit as it is; and would have been a very distinguished monument of his talents if his original design had been completed, and he had not been curbed and controlled in the progress of it by his employers. — John Nichols, The Gentleman's Magazine, Volume 86

All Saints' Church, Southampton Act 1793
- Act of Parliament
- Parliament of Great Britain
- Long title: An Act for amending and enlarging the Powers of an Act, made in the Thirty-first Year of the Reign of His present Majesty, intituled, "An Act for taking down and re-building the Parish Church of All Saints, within the Town and County of the Town of Southampton; and for purchasing Land for the Purpose of a Church Yard, for the Use of the said Parish."
- Citation: 33 Geo. 3. c. 101
- Territorial extent: Great Britain

Dates
- Royal assent: 30 April 1793
- Commencement: 30 April 1793 (Note: The Acts of Parliament (Commencement) Act 1793.)
Other legislation
Amends	All Saints Church, Southampton Act 1791
Amended by	All Saints Church, Southampton Act 1797

Status: Amended

Text of statute as originally enacted

The foundation stone was laid by the Provincial Grand Master of the Freemasons, Thomas Dunckerley, and the ceremony was also attended by the poet laureate, Henry Pye, who wrote an ode for the ceremony. The Mayor of Southampton and other dignitaries were also in attendance. The powers awarded to the church's trustees in the 1791 act for fundraising proved insufficient and another act, the All Saints' Church, Southampton Act 1793 (33 Geo. 3. c. 101), was passed two years later to remedy this. The 1793 legislation's introduction reported that the demolition had been completed and construction of the new building was underway. The 1791 act allowed the trustees to borrow up to £5,000, and to collect rates on property and rents in the parish of up to one shilling in each pound. The 1793 act allowed them to raise an additional £4,000 among other provisions. The building was completed in 1795. The catacombs of the original church remained intact and were incorporated into the new building. This underground cemetery reached slightly beyond the footprint of the actual building, extending under a portion of the High Street itself. In addition to the catacombs, a separate graveyard was established, located south of East Street on Back of the Walls (another Southampton street). This location was technically outside of the All Saints' parish boundary.

This drawing of Southampton High Street in 1839 by GF Sargent shows the pillared façade of the church in relation to the Bargate in the background.

All Saints Church, Southampton Act 1797
- Act of Parliament
- Parliament of Great Britain
- Long title: To amend two acts, made in the thirty-first and thirty-third years of the reign of his present Majesty, for taking down and rebuilding the parish church of All Saints within the town and county of the town of Southampton.
- Citation: 38 Geo. 3. c. i
- Territorial extent: Great Britain

Dates
- Royal assent: 30 December 1797
- Commencement: 30 December 1797
Other legislation
Amends	All Saints Church, Southampton Act 1791; All Saints' Church, Southampton Act 1793

Status: Current legislation

Text of statute as originally enacted

The first rector of the new church was Richard Mant, who preached a sermon when the building was consecrated in that year. In the sermon, Mant made comments which were seen as an abusive attack on the "dissenters" – that is, those Christians who did not exclusively use the Church of England's prescribed forms of prayer – and this prompted a detailed written response from William Kingsbury, the minister of an independent church in Southampton. Kingsbury's letter sparked a response from Brian Monckhouse of Oxford, which in turn led to much further debate and publications on the matter including a "pastoral charge" by the Bishop of Salisbury. Mant's son, also called Richard, had been born in Southampton in 1776 and went on to become a bishop. A further act of Parliament, the All Saints Church, Southampton Act 1797 (38 Geo. 3. c. i), was passed in 1797, after the new building had been constructed and furnished, allowing the trustees to raise up to £4,000 more and increasing the percentage they could collect from properties in the parish to one shilling and sixpence in the pound.

=== 19th century ===
In the early 19th century, novelist Jane Austen lived in the parish and regularly attended the church, mentioning it occasionally in her correspondence. In her letters, she noted in January 1809 that she and her family had been unable to attend for two consecutive Sundays but despite the third Sunday being "very blowing" they did manage to attend that week. Painter Sir John Everett Millais, born in 1829, was baptised in the church. The Law Commission estimate that the last debt relating to the construction of the building would have been paid by 1840. By 1843 the graveyard was full, and it was closed around 1885.

The church's single bell dated from 1828 and was manufactured by Warner of London. The rectory, which had been located in East Street since the fifteenth century, was sold in 1858 and a new one purchased, in Anglesea Place. A new organ was installed in the church three years later. The organ was manufactured by Bevington and Son and consisted of three tiers: a great with 11 stops, a swell with ten stops, and a choir organ with five stops. July 1872 saw a substantial refurbishment programme take place, with the original ceiling of the main sanctuary being completely replaced. The original plaster ceiling was removed with the new one constructed from wood, resulting in a weight reduction of 25 tons. The scheme cost £1,900.

=== 20th and 21st centuries ===
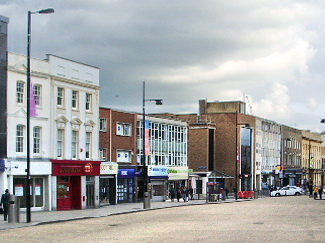
The site of All Saints' Church in 2007, now occupied by an Oxfam charity shop

In 1914, the graveyard was formally deconsecrated and the headstones were removed from the site, which became a children's playground in the 1930s and subsequently a multi-storey car park.

During the Second World War the church was damaged beyond repair in a German bombing raid in December 1940. In August 1944, the human remains housed in the catacombs were transferred to Hollybrook Cemetery in Southampton where they were reburied in a single communal grave. In all, the remains of 403 people were transferred, some fairly well preserved in their oak coffins with leaden shells, but others had disintegrated completely. The ruins of the church building were subsequently demolished – sources do not indicate exactly when – and replaced by shops and a multi-storey car park. The parish registers were successfully retrieved from the ruin and, despite being charred and damaged by candle wax and molten tar (the results of a fire that followed the bombing), they have been restored.

Despite the debts related to the costs for the construction of the building having been settled in the early-mid 19th century, and the church ceasing to exist 100 years later, the three acts of Parliament allowing trustees of the church to levy rates on properties in the parish for the purpose of settling those debts remained in force and untouched until the Law Commission proposed their repeal in July 2014, with a view to presenting recommendations to Parliament in 2015. However, as of 2023 there have been no further Statute Law (Repeals) Acts.

== Architecture ==
=== Exterior ===
The frontage measured 60 feet 6 inches (18.44 m) wide and had four columns which measured 4 feet (1.2 m) in diameter by 36 feet (11 m) high. The columns were topped with Grecian pilasters and supported a pediment. The lower part of the three spaces between the four pillars were filled with wide arches, with the entrance doors topped with fanlights below them. The building had staircases on each side, lit by semi-circular headed windows between the outer columns and the pilaster.

There was an entablature around the building supported by similar pilasters to those atop the columns. The south side of the building, which faced East Street, had two rows of eight windows; each window was 6 feet (1.8 m) wide, with the upper windows 13 feet (4.0 m) high and the bottom row 6 feet (1.8 m) high. The north side had no windows because it adjoined the neighbouring buildings.

On the east end of the roof, the church had a cupola which was topped with a large concrete pineapple. Pineapples were a feature of several buildings in Southampton as a symbol of welcome, an idea that originated in the Caribbean and which possibly reached the city as a result of the slave trade in the 16th century. The pineapple survived the bombing and has been exhibited on special occasions, such as during Black History Month.

=== Interior ===
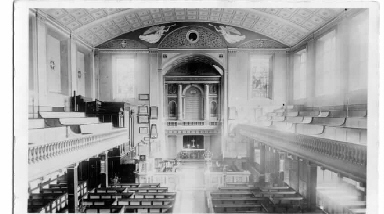
Interior of the church in 1910

Inside the church, the arched ceiling of the main sanctuary was unsupported by internal pillars and spanned the whole length and width of the church, measuring 90 feet (27 m) by 60 feet (18 m). In his book A Walk Through Southampton, Sir Henry Englefield lamented the positioning of the pews, pulpit and reading desk:

On entering this church, the bold and graceful curvature of the roof claims high admiration. The distribution of the whole area into pews, destroys the effect of this building, as it does of every other sacred edifice in this country: but a new and peculiar deformity exists in this church, contrary alike to good taste and the uniform practice of the church of England. The pulpit and reading-desk are placed in the centre of the church, so as completely to hide the altar from almost every part of it; and the officiating minister turns his back directly to it during the whole of the service. It is to be lamented, that the church of England, having formed her liturgy and ritual most closely on the model of the primitive church, did not at the same time adopt the form of the ancient ambones or desks, which stood on each side of the nave, of equal height, and from which in turn the different parts of the service were read: instead of huddling into one mean and incongruous group, the clerk's desk, the reading desk, and pulpit, to which the art of man cannot give either dignity or grace. In the church which we are now considering, the reading desk and pulpit might have been placed, with peculiarly good effect, on each side of the recess for the altar; and as the sounding board is omitted, a very elegant form might have been given to them, with no great deviation from the usual shape. As they now stand, besides their very irreverent position with respect to the altar, they have the exact resemblance to the establishment of an auctioneer.

— Sir Henry Englefield, A Walk Through Southampton: Including a Survey of Its Antiquities, pages 20-21

== Notable burials ==
The local newspaper, the Southern Daily Echo, claims one of the Chancellors of the Exchequer who served under Charles II was buried in the catacombs, but does not specify which chancellor this was. Rear-Admiral Philip De Carteret, a renowned Royal Navy officer and explorer who participated in two circumnavigation expeditions in 1764–66 and 1766–69, was also buried in the catacombs. Another naval officer, Captain Sir Thomas Carew, was interred in the catacombs on 2 May 1840.
