= Nautical Almanack Act 1828 =

Act of the Parliament of the United Kingdom

Nautical Almanack Act 1828 (Note: The citation of this act by this short title was authorised by section 1 of, and the first schedule to, the Short Titles Act 1896. Due to the repeal of those provisions it is now authorised by section 19(2) of the Interpretation Act 1978.)
- Act of Parliament
- Parliament of the United Kingdom
- Long title: An Act for repealing the Laws now in force relating to the Discovery of the Longitude at Sea.
- Citation: 9 Geo. 4. c. 66
- Territorial extent: United Kingdom

Dates
- Royal assent: 15 July 1828
- Commencement: 15 July 1828 (Note: The Acts of Parliament (Commencement) Act 1793.)
Other legislation
Repeals/revokes	See § Repealed enactments
Amended by	Statute Law Revision Act 1873
Relates to	Discovery of Longitude at Sea Act 1713; Discovery of North-West Passage Act 1744; Discovery of Longitude at Sea Act 1753; Discovery of Northern Passage Act 1776; Discovery of Longitude at Sea Act 1790; Discovery of Longitude at Sea Act 1774

Status: Partially repealed

Text of statute as originally enacted

Revised text of statute as amended

Text of the Nautical Almanack Act 1828 as in force today (including any amendments) within the United Kingdom, from legislation.gov.uk.

The Nautical Almanack Act 1828 (9 Geo. 4. c. 66) is an act of the Parliament of the United Kingdom that repealed the earlier acts governing rewards for the discovery of the longitude at sea and authorised the Lord High Admiral to publish the Nautical Almanack.

== Provisions ==
=== Publication of the Nautical Almanack ===
Section 2 of the act empowered the Lord High Admiral, or the commissioners for executing the office of Lord High Admiral, to cause nautical almanacks and other tables useful for finding the longitude at sea to be constructed, printed, published and sold free of stamp duty. It made it an offence to print, publish or sell any such almanack or table without the licence of the Lord High Admiral or the commissioners, signified under the hand of the secretary of the Admiralty, on penalty of £20 for every copy, recoverable with costs and applied to the use of the Royal Hospital for Seamen at Greenwich.

=== Repealed enactments ===
Section 1 of the act repealed 2 enactments, listed in that section, and generally repealed all other acts then in force relating to the appointment, or to the authorities and powers, of commissioners, or to the payment of a reward, for the discovery of the longitude at sea or for any invention or proposal relating to it, except as provided by that section.

Citation	Short title	Description	Extent of repeal
58 Geo. 3. c. 20	Discovery of Longitude at Sea, etc. Act 1818	An Act for more effectually discovering the Longitude at Sea, and encouraging Attempts to find a Northern Passage between the Atlantic and Pacific Oceans, and to approach the Northern Pole.	The whole act.
1 & 2 Geo. 4. c. 2	Discovery of Longitude at Sea, etc. Act 1821	An Act to amend an Act of the Fifty-eighth Year of His late Majesty, for more effectually discovering the Longitude at Sea, and encouraging Attempts to find a Northern Passage between the Atlantic and Pacific Oceans, and to approach the Northern Pole.	The whole act.

== Subsequent developments ==
Section 1 of the act was repealed by section 1 of, and the schedule to, the Statute Law Revision Act 1873 (36 & 37 Vict. c. 91), which came into force on 5 August 1873.
