= Longitude Act =

Act of the Parliament of Great Britain

Discovery of Longitude at Sea Act 1713
- Act of Parliament
- Parliament of Great Britain
- Long title: An Act for Providing a Publick Reward for such Person or Persons as shall Discover the Longitude at Sea.
- Citation: 13 Ann. c. 14 (Note: This is the citation in The Statutes of the Realm.); 12 Ann. St. 2. c. 15 (Note: This is the citation in The Statutes at Large.)

Dates
- Royal assent: 9 July 1714
- Commencement: 16 February 1714 (Note: Start of session.)
- Repealed: 8 May 1818
Other legislation
Amended by	Discovery of Longitude at Sea Act 1753; Discovery of Longitude at Sea Act 1762; Discovery of Longitude at Sea (John Harrison) Act 1763; Discovery of Longitude at Sea Act 1774
Repealed by	Discovery of Longitude at Sea, etc. Act 1818
Relates to	Discovery of Longitude at Sea, etc. Act 1821; Nautical Almanack Act 1828

Status: Repealed

Text of statute as originally enacted

The Longitude Act 1714 (13 Ann. c. 14), also known as the Discovery of Longitude at Sea Act 1713, was an act of the Parliament of Great Britain passed in July 1714 at the end of the reign of Queen Anne. It established the Board of Longitude and established a inducement prize contest (the longitude rewards) for anyone who could find a simple and practical method for the precise determination of a ship's longitude. The 1714 act was followed by a series of other Longitude Acts that revised or replaced the original.

== Background ==
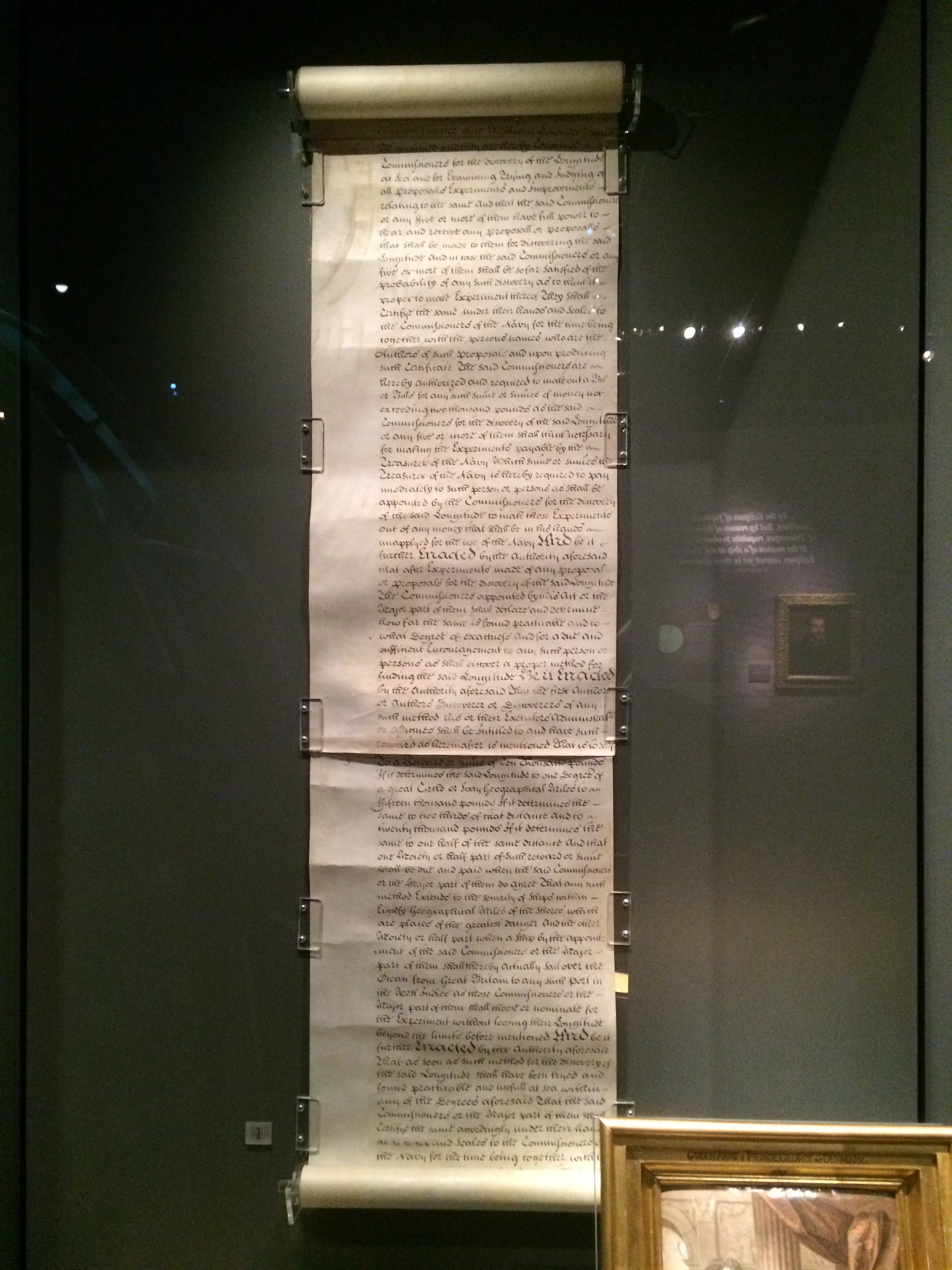
The original Longitude Act 1714

As transoceanic travel became ever more relevant, so did the importance of accurate and reliable navigation at sea. Scientists and navigators had been working on the problem of measuring longitude for a long time. While determining latitude was relatively easy, early ocean navigators had to rely on dead reckoning to find longitude. This was particularly inaccurate on long voyages without sight of land and could sometimes lead to tragedy, as during the Scilly naval disaster of 1707, which claimed the lives of nearly 2,000 sailors. This brought the problem of measuring longitude at sea into sharp focus once more. Following the Merchants and Seamen Petition, which called for finding an adequate solution and was presented to Parliament in May 1714, the Longitude Act was passed in July 1714.

For details on many of the efforts towards determining the longitude, see History of longitude.

== The rewards ==
The act offered a series of rewards, rather than a single prize. The rewards increased with the accuracy achieved: £10,000 (worth over £1.69 million in 2025) for anyone who could find a practical way of determining longitude at sea with an error of not greater than one degree of longitude (equates to 60 nautical miles (110 km; 69 mi) at the equator). The reward was to be increased to £15,000 if the error was not greater than 40 minutes, and further enhanced to £20,000 (equivalent to £3.97 million in 2025) if it was not greater than half a degree. Other rewards were on offer for those who presented methods that worked within 80 geographical miles of the coast (being the most treacherous part of voyages) and for those with promising ideas who needed help to bring them to readiness for trial. Many rewards were paid out over the 114 years of the Board of Longitude's existence. John Harrison received more money than any other individual, with several rewards from the 1730s–1750s, and £10,000 in 1765.

== Later Acts ==
Discovery of Longitude at Sea, etc. Act 1818
- Act of Parliament
- Parliament of the United Kingdom
- Long title: An Act for more effectually discovering the Longitude at Sea, and encouraging Attempts to find a Northern Passage between the Atlantic and Pacific Oceans, and to approach the Northern Pole.
- Citation: 58 Geo. 3. c. 20
- Territorial extent: United Kingdom

Dates
- Royal assent: 8 May 1818
- Commencement: 8 May 1818 (Note: The Acts of Parliament (Commencement) Act 1793.)
- Repealed: 15 July 1828
Other legislation
Repeals/revokes	Discovery of Longitude at Sea Act 1713; Discovery of North-West Passage Act 1744; Discovery of Longitude at Sea Act 1753; Discovery of Northern Passage Act 1776; Discovery of Longitude at Sea Act 1790
Amended by	Discovery of Longitude at Sea, etc. Act 1821
Repealed by	Nautical Almanack Act 1828

Status: Repealed

Text of statute as originally enacted

Discovery of Longitude at Sea, etc. Act 1821
- Act of Parliament
- Parliament of the United Kingdom
- Long title: An Act to amend an Act of the Fifty-eighth Year of His late Majesty, for more effectually discovering the Longitude at Sea, and encouraging Attempts to find a Northern Passage between the Atlantic and Pacific Oceans, and to approach the Northern Pole.
- Citation: 1 & 2 Geo. 4. c. 20
- Territorial extent: United Kingdom

Dates
- Royal assent: 23 February 1821
- Commencement: 23 February 1821 (Note: Section 1.)
- Repealed: 15 July 1828
Other legislation
Amends	Discovery of Longitude at Sea, etc. Act 1818
Repealed by	Nautical Almanack Act 1828
Relates to	Discovery of Longitude at Sea Act 1713; Discovery of North-West Passage Act 1744; Discovery of Longitude at Sea Act 1753; Discovery of Northern Passage Act 1776; Discovery of Longitude at Sea Act 1790; Discovery of Longitude at Sea Act 1774

Status: Repealed

Text of statute as originally enacted

Subsequent Longitude Acts offered different rewards. The act of Parliament of 1767 held out £5,000 for improvements to Tobias Mayer's lunar tables.

=== 1774 ===
Discovery of Longitude at Sea Act 1774
- Act of Parliament
- Parliament of Great Britain
- Long title: An Act for the Repeal of all former Acts concerning the Longitude at Sea, except so much thereof as relates to the Appointment and Authority of the Commissioners thereby constituted, and also such Clauses as relate to the constructing, printing, publishing, vending, and licensing of Nautical Almanacks, and other useful Tables; and for the more effectual Encouragement and Reward of such Person and Persons as shall discover a Method for finding the same, or shall make useful Discoveries in Navigation; and for the better making Experiments relating thereto.
- Citation: 14 Geo. 3. c. 66
- Territorial extent: Great Britain

Dates
- Royal assent: 2 June 1774
- Commencement: 24 June 1774 (Note: Section 1.)
- Repealed: 21 August 1871
Other legislation
Repeals/revokes	See § Repealed enactments
Amended by	Finding of the Longitude at Sea Act 1776
Repealed by	Statute Law Revision Act 1871
Relates to	Discovery of Longitude at Sea, etc. Act 1818; Discovery of Longitude at Sea, etc. Act 1821; Nautical Almanack Act 1828

Status: Repealed

Text of statute as originally enacted

The Discovery of Longitude at Sea Act 1774 (14 Geo. 3. c. 66) halved the amount offered for any method or instrument achieving the degrees of precision outlined in the original act (i.e. £5,000 for a degree, £7,500 for 2/3 of a degree or £10,000 for 1/2 a degree). The act repealed the earlier legislation providing rewards for the discovery of a method of finding the longitude at sea, saving the provisions constituting the Commissioners for the Discovery of the Longitude (the Board of Longitude) and those relating to the Nautical Almanac, and made new and reduced provision for such rewards.

Section 1 of the act repealed 8 enactments, listed in that section, except so far as they related to the appointment and authority of the commissioners thereby constituted, or to the constructing, printing, publishing, vending, and licensing of nautical almanacks and other useful tables.

Citation	Short title	Description	Extent of repeal
13 Ann. c. 14 12 Ann. St. 2. c. 15	Discovery of Longitude at Sea Act 1713	An Act for Providing a Publick Reward for such Person or Persons as shall Discover the Longitude at Sea.	The whole act, except so far as it relates to the appointment and authority of the commissioners thereby constituted, and except such clauses as relate to the constructing, printing, publishing, vending, and licensing of nautical almanacks and other useful tables.
14 Geo. 2. c. 39	Longitude and Latitude Act 1740	An Act for surveying the Chief Ports and Head Lands, on the Coasts of Great Britain and Ireland, and the Islands and Plantations thereto belonging, in order to the more exact Determination of the Longitude and Latitude thereof.	The whole act, except so far as it relates to the appointment and authority of the commissioners thereby constituted, and except such clauses as relate to the constructing, printing, publishing, vending, and licensing of nautical almanacks and other useful tables.
26 Geo. 2. c. 25	Discovery of Longitude at Sea Act 1753	An Act to render more effectual an Act made in the Twelfth Year of the Reign of Her late Majesty Queen Anne, intituled, "An Act for providing a publick Reward for such Person or Persons as shall discover the Longitude at Sea," with regard to the making Experiments of Proposals made for discovering the Longitude; and to enlarge the Number of Commissioners for putting in Execution the said Act.	The whole act, except so far as it relates to the appointment and authority of the commissioners thereby constituted, and except such clauses as relate to the constructing, printing, publishing, vending, and licensing of nautical almanacks and other useful tables.
2 Geo. 3. c. 18	Discovery of Longitude at Sea Act 1762	An Act for rendering more effectual an Act, made in the Twelfth Year of the Reign of Her late Majesty Queen Anne, intituled, "An Act for providing a Publick Reward for such Person or Persons as shall discover the Longitude at Sea," with regard to the making Experiments of Proposals made for discovering the Longitude.	The whole act, except so far as it relates to the appointment and authority of the commissioners thereby constituted, and except such clauses as relate to the constructing, printing, publishing, vending, and licensing of nautical almanacks and other useful tables.
3 Geo. 3. c. 14	Discovery of Longitude at Sea (John Harrison) Act 1763	An Act for the Encouragement of John Harrison to publish and make known his Invention of a Machine, or Watch, for the Discovery of the Longitude at Sea.	The whole act, except so far as it relates to the appointment and authority of the commissioners thereby constituted, and except such clauses as relate to the constructing, printing, publishing, vending, and licensing of nautical almanacks and other useful tables.
5 Geo. 3. c. 11	Discovery of Longitude at Sea Act 1765	An Act for rendering more effectual an Act made in the Twelfth Year of the Reign of Her late Majesty Queen Anne, intituled, "An Act for providing a publick Reward for such Person or Persons as shall discover the Longitude at Sea," with regard to the making Experiments of Proposals made for discovering the Longitude.	The whole act, except so far as it relates to the appointment and authority of the commissioners thereby constituted, and except such clauses as relate to the constructing, printing, publishing, vending, and licensing of nautical almanacks and other useful tables.
5 Geo. 3. c. 20	Discovery of Longitude at Sea (No. 2) Act 1765	An Act for explaining and rendering more effectual Two Acts, One, made in the Twelfth Year of the Reign of Queen Anne, intituled, "An Act for providing a publick Reward for such Person or Persons as shall discover the Longitude at Sea;" and the other, in the Twenty-sixth Year of the Reign of King George the Second, intituled, "An Act to render more effectual an Act made in the Twelfth Year of the Reign of Her late Majesty Queen Anne, intituled, 'An Act for providing a publick Reward for such Person or Persons as shall discover the Longitude at Sea,' with regard to the making Experiments of Proposals made for discovering the Longitude; and to enlarge the Number of Commissioners for putting in Execution the said Act."	The whole act, except so far as it relates to the appointment and authority of the commissioners thereby constituted, and except such clauses as relate to the constructing, printing, publishing, vending, and licensing of nautical almanacks and other useful tables.
10 Geo. 3. c. 34	Discovery of Longitude at Sea Act 1770	An Act for rendering more effectual several Acts for providing a Publick Reward for discovering the Longitude at Sea; for improving the Lunar Tables constructed by the late Professor Mayer; and for encouraging Discoveries and Improvements useful to Navigation.	The whole act, except so far as it relates to the appointment and authority of the commissioners thereby constituted, and except such clauses as relate to the constructing, printing, publishing, vending, and licensing of nautical almanacks and other useful tables.

=== 1818 ===
The Discovery of Longitude at Sea, etc. Act 1818 (58 Geo. 3. c. 20), which completely revised the composition and remit of the Board of Longitude, again changed the rewards, by now offered for improvements to navigation in general rather than simply for finding longitude. In addition, the act outlined rewards for navigating the North West Passage, again on a sliding scale from £20,000 for reaching the Pacific through a north-west passage to £5,000 for reaching 110 degrees west or 89 degrees north and £1,000 for reaching 83 degrees north. In 1820, £5,000 was paid to the officers and crews of HMS Hecla and HMS Griper under the act.

=== 1821 ===
The 1818 act was amended by the Discovery of Longitude at Sea, etc. Act 1821 (1 & 2 Geo. 4. c. 20).

=== 1828 ===
The 1818 and 1821 acts were repealed by section 1 of the Nautical Almanack Act 1828 (9 Geo. 4. c. 66).

=== 1871 ===
The whole 1774 act was repealed by section 1 of, and the schedule to, the Statute Law Revision Act 1871 (34 & 35 Vict. c. 116), which came into force on 21 August 1871.
