= List of acts of the Parliament of the United Kingdom from 1821 =

This is a complete list of acts of the Parliament of the United Kingdom for the year 1821.

Note that the first parliament of the United Kingdom was held in 1801; parliaments between 1707 and 1800 were either parliaments of Great Britain or of Ireland). For acts passed up until 1707, see the list of acts of the Parliament of England and the list of acts of the Parliament of Scotland. For acts passed from 1707 to 1800, see the list of acts of the Parliament of Great Britain. See also the list of acts of the Parliament of Ireland.

For acts of the devolved parliaments and assemblies in the United Kingdom, see the list of acts of the Scottish Parliament, the list of acts of the Northern Ireland Assembly, and the list of acts and measures of Senedd Cymru; see also the list of acts of the Parliament of Northern Ireland.

The number shown after each act's title is its chapter number. Acts passed before 1963 are cited using this number, preceded by the year(s) of the reign during which the relevant parliamentary session was held; thus the Union with Ireland Act 1800 is cited as "39 & 40 Geo. 3 c. 67", meaning the 67th act passed during the session that started in the 39th year of the reign of George III and which finished in the 40th year of that reign. Note that the modern convention is to use Arabic numerals in citations (thus "41 Geo. 3" rather than "41 Geo. III"). Acts of the last session of the Parliament of Great Britain and the first session of the Parliament of the United Kingdom are both cited as "41 Geo. 3". Acts passed from 1963 onwards are simply cited by calendar year and chapter number.

All modern acts have a short title, e.g. the Local Government Act 2003. Some earlier acts also have a short title given to them by later acts, such as by the Short Titles Act 1896.

== 1 & 2 Geo. 4 ==
The second session of the 7th Parliament of the United Kingdom, which met from 23 January 1821 until 11 July 1821.

This session was also traditionally cited as 1 & 2 G. 4.

=== Public general acts ===
| Short title | Citation | Royal assent |
Long title
| Provision for Queen Caroline Act 1821 (repealed) | 1 & 2 Geo. 4. c. 1 | 23 February 1821 |
An act for enabling His Majesty to make Provision for Her Majesty the Queen. (Repealed by Statute Law Revision Act 1873 (36 & 37 Vict. c. 91))
| Discovery of Longitude at Sea, etc. Act 1821 (repealed) | 1 & 2 Geo. 4. c. 2 | 23 February 1821 |
An act to amend an Act of the Fifty eighth Year of His Late Majesty, (Note: Discovery of Longitude at Sea, etc. Act 1818 (58 Geo. 3. c. 20)) for more effectually discovering the Longitude at Sea, and encouraging Attempts to find a Northern Passage between the Atlantic and Pacific Oceans, and to approach the Northern Pole. (Repealed by Nautical Almanack Act 1828 (9 Geo. 4. c. 66))
| Duties on Malt, etc. Act 1821 (repealed) | 1 & 2 Geo. 4. c. 3 | 23 February 1821 |
An act for continuing to His Majesty certain Duties on Malt, Sugar, Tobacco and Snuff, Foreign Spirits and Sweets, in Great Britain; and on Pensions, Offices and Personal Estates in England; for the Service of the Year one thousand eight hundred and twenty one. (Repealed by Statute Law Revision Act 1873 (36 & 37 Vict. c. 91))
| Supply Act 1821 (repealed) | 1 & 2 Geo. 4. c. 4 | 23 February 1821 |
An Act for applying certain Monies therein mentioned for the service of the Year one thousand eight hundred and twenty one. (Repealed by Statute Law Revision Act 1873 (36 & 37 Vict. c. 91))
| Indemnity Act 1821 (repealed) | 1 & 2 Geo. 4. c. 5 | 24 March 1821 |
An Act to indemnify such Persons in the United Kingdom as have omitted to qualify themselves for Offices and Employments, and for extending the Time limited for certain of those Purposes respectively, until the Twenty fifth Day of March One thousand eight hundred and twenty two; and to permit such Persons in Great Britain as have omitted to make and file Affidavits of the Execution of Indentures of Clerks to Attornies and Solicitors, to make and file the same on or before the First Day of Hilary Term One thousand eight hundred and twenty two, and to allow Persons to make and file such Affidavits, although the Persons whom they served shall have neglected to take out their Annual Certificates. (Repealed by Promissory Oaths Act 1871 (34 & 35 Vict. c. 48))
| Transportation Act 1821 (repealed) | 1 & 2 Geo. 4. c. 6 | 24 March 1821 |
An Act to continue for Two Years from the passing thereof, to the End of the then next Session of Parliament, the several Acts for the Transportation of Offenders from Great Britain. (Repealed by Statute Law Revision Act 1873 (36 & 37 Vict. c. 91))
| Importation (Nova Scotia) Act 1821 (repealed) | 1 & 2 Geo. 4. c. 7 | 24 March 1821 |
An Act to make perpetual An Act of the Fifty eighth Year of His late Majesty, (Note: Importation and Exportation Act 1818 (58 Geo. 3. c. 19)) to allow the Importation into certain Ports in Nova Scotia and New Brunswick, of certain enumerated Articles and the Re-exportation thereof from such Ports. (Repealed by Trade Act 1822 (3 Geo. 4. c. 44))
| New South Wales Duties Act 1821 (repealed) | 1 & 2 Geo. 4. c. 8 | 24 March 1821 |
An Act to continue, until the First Day of January One thousand eight hundred and twenty three, an Act of the Fifty ninth Year of His late Majesty, (Note: Duties in New South Wales Act 1819 (59 Geo. 3. c. 114)) for staying Proceedings against any Governor or other Persons concerned in imposing and levying Duties in New South Wales; for continuing certain Duties; and for empowering the said Governor to levy a Duty on Spirits made in the said Colony. (Repealed by Statute Law Revision Act 1873 (36 & 37 Vict. c. 91))
| Mutiny Act 1821 (repealed) | 1 & 2 Geo. 4. c. 9 | 24 March 1821 |
An Act for punishing Mutiny and Desertion; and for the better Payment of the Army and their Quarters. (Repealed by Statute Law Revision Act 1873 (36 & 37 Vict. c. 91))
| Marine Mutiny Act 1821 (repealed) | 1 & 2 Geo. 4. c. 10 | 24 March 1821 |
An Act for the regulating of His Majesty's Royal Marine Forces while on Shore. (Repealed by Statute Law Revision Act 1873 (36 & 37 Vict. c. 91))
| Silk Manufacture, etc. Act 1821 (repealed) | 1 & 2 Geo. 4. c. 11 | 24 March 1821 |
An Act to continue until the Twenty fifth Day of March One thousand eight hundred and twenty four, the Bounties on the Exportation of certain Silk Manufactures, and the Duties on the Importation of Buck Wheat. (Repealed by Statute Law Revision Act 1873 (36 & 37 Vict. c. 91))
| Flax, etc., Manufacture Act 1821 (repealed) | 1 & 2 Geo. 4. c. 12 | 24 March 1821 |
An Act to continue until the Twenty fifth Day of July One thousand eight hundred and twenty two, an Act of the Twenty third Year of His late Majesty, (Note: Flax, etc., Manufacture Act 1783 (23 Geo. 3. c. 77)) for the More effectual Encouragement of the Manufacture of Flax and Cotton in Great Britain. (Repealed by Statute Law Revision Act 1873 (36 & 37 Vict. c. 91))
| Glass Duties Act 1821 (repealed) | 1 & 2 Geo. 4. c. 13 | 24 March 1821 |
An Act to continue until the Twenty fifth Day of July One thousand eight hundred and twenty four, an Act of the Fifty ninth Year of His late Majesty, (Note: Excise (No. 4) Act 1819 (59 Geo. 3. c. 104)) to continue certain Laws of Excise with regard to Crown Glass, and Flint and Phial Glass, and to alter certain Laws with regard to Flint Glass. (Repealed by Statute Law Revision Act 1873 (36 & 37 Vict. c. 91))
| Importation Act 1821 (repealed) | 1 & 2 Geo. 4. c. 14 | 24 March 1821 |
An Act to revive and continue, until the Twenty fifth Day of March One thousand eight hundred and twenty four, an Act of the Seventh Year of King George the Second, (Note: Importation Act 1733 (7 Geo. 2. c. 18)) for the free Importation of Cochineal and Indigo. (Repealed by Statute Law Revision Act 1861 (24 & 25 Vict. c. 101))
| Stocks, etc., of Lunatics Act 1821 (repealed) | 1 & 2 Geo. 4. c. 15 | 24 March 1821 |
An Act to authorize the Transfer of Stocks and Payment of Dividends of Lunatics residing out of England. (Repealed by Infants, Lunatics, etc. Act 1825 (6 Geo. 4. c. 74))
| Court of King's Bench, Westminster Act 1821 (repealed) | 1 & 2 Geo. 4. c. 16 | 6 April 1821 |
An Act for further facilitating the Despatch of Business in the Court of King's Bench. (Repealed by King's Bench (England) Act 1822 (3 Geo. 4. c. 102))
| Attorneys and Solicitors (Ireland) Act 1821 (repealed) | 1 & 2 Geo. 4. c. 17 | 6 April 1821 |
An Act to explain and amend an Act of the Parliament of Ireland, passed in the Seventh Year of the Reign of His Majesty King George the Second, for better regulating the Payment of Fees of Attornies and Solicitors, and other Purposes therein mentioned. (Repealed by Solicitors (Ireland) Act 1849 (12 & 13 Vict. c. 53))
| Witchcraft, etc. (Ireland) Act 1821 (repealed) | 1 & 2 Geo. 4. c. 18 | 6 April 1821 |
An Act to repeal an Act, made in the Parliament of Ireland in the Twenty eighth Year of the Reign of Queen Elizabeth, against Witchcraft and Sorcery. (Repealed by Statute Law Revision Act 1873 (36 & 37 Vict. c. 91))
| Exportation Between Great Britain and Ireland Act 1821 (repealed) | 1 & 2 Geo. 4. c. 19 | 6 April 1821 |
An Act to permit the Removal of certain Goods from Great Britain to Ireland, and from Ireland to Great Britain, by Cocket, Certificate, Let Pass or Transire. (Repealed by Customs Law Repeal Act 1825 (6 Geo. 4. c. 105))
| Duties on Horses Act 1821 (repealed) | 1 & 2 Geo. 4. c. 20 | 6 April 1821 |
An Act to continue until the Fifth Day of April One thousand eight hundred and twenty three, several Acts of His late Majesty, for reducing the Duties payable on Horses used for the Purposes therein mentioned. (Repealed by Revenue Act 1869 (32 & 33 Vict. c. 14) (Note: Incorrectly cited as "Revenue, 1869 c. 4" in the Chronological Table of the Statutes.))
| Disfranchisement of Grampound Act 1821 (repealed) | 1 & 2 Geo. 4. c. 21 | 6 April 1821 |
An act to indemnify Persons who shall give Evidence before the Lords Spiritual and Temporal on the Bill to exclude the Borough of Grampound, in the County of Cornwall, from sending Burgesses to serve in Parliament; and to enable the Borough of Leeds, in the County of York, to send Two Burgesses to serve in Parliament in lieu thereof. (Repealed by Statute Law Revision Act 1873 (36 & 37 Vict. c. 91))
| Beer Duties Act 1821 (repealed) | 1 & 2 Geo. 4. c. 22 | 19 April 1821 |
An Act for altering and amending the Laws of Excise for securing the Payment of the Duties on Beer and Ale brewed in Great Britain. (Repealed by Inland Revenue Act 1880 (43 & 44 Vict. c. 20))
| Inclosure Act 1821 (repealed) | 1 & 2 Geo. 4. c. 23 | 19 April 1821 |
An Act to amend the Law respecting the inclosing of Open Fields, Pastures, Moors, Commons and Waste Lands in England. (Repealed by Commons Act 1899 (62 & 63 Vict. c. 30))
| Treason (Ireland) Act 1821 | 1 & 2 Geo. 4. c. 24 | 19 April 1821 |
An Act to extend certain Provisions of an Act of King William the Third, intituled "An Act for regulating of Trials in Cases of Treason and Misprision of Treason," (Note: Treason Act 1695 (7 & 8 Will. 3. c. 3)) to that part of the United Kingdom called Ireland.
| Quartering of Soldiers Act 1821 (repealed) | 1 & 2 Geo. 4. c. 25 | 19 April 1821 |
An Act for fixing the Rates of Subsistence to be paid to Innkeepers and others on quartering Soldiers. (Repealed by Statute Law Revision Act 1873 (36 & 37 Vict. c. 91))
| Bank of England Act 1821 (repealed) | 1 & 2 Geo. 4. c. 26 | 7 May 1821 |
An Act for making further Provision for the gradual Resumption of Payments in Cash by the Bank of England. (Repealed by Statute Law Revision Act 1870 (33 & 34 Vict. c. 69))
| Bank of Ireland (No. 1) Act 1821 (repealed) | 1 & 2 Geo. 4. c. 27 | 7 May 1821 |
An Act for making further Provision for the Resumption of Payments in Cash by the Bank of Ireland. (Repealed by Statute Law Revision Act 1870 (33 & 34 Vict. c. 69))
| West Africa Act 1821 or the West Coast of Africa Possessions Act 1821 (repealed) | 1 & 2 Geo. 4. c. 28 | 7 May 1821 |
An Act for abolishing the African Company, and transferring to and vesting in His Majesty all the Forts, Possessions, and Property now belonging to or held by them. (Repealed by Statute Law Revision Act 1964 (c. 79))
| Duty on Irish Starch Act 1821 (repealed) | 1 & 2 Geo. 4. c. 29 | 7 May 1821 |
An Act to remove Doubts on the Allowances of the Duty paid on Irish Starch imported into Great Britain, payable on such Starch consumed in preparing Manu factures of Flax or Cotton in Great Britain, and for regulating the Importation thereof. (Repealed by Statute Law Revision Act 1861 (24 & 25 Vict. c. 101))
| Holyhead Roads Act 1821 (repealed) | 1 & 2 Geo. 4. c. 30 | 28 May 1821 |
An Act for further improving the Roads between London and Holyhead, by Coventry, Birmingham and Shrewsbury. (Repealed by Statute Law (Repeals) Act 2013 (c. 2))
| Hereditary Revenues Act 1821 (repealed) | 1 & 2 Geo. 4. c. 31 | 28 May 1821 |
An Act for removing Doubts as to the Continuance of the Hereditary Revenue in Scotland. (Repealed by Statute Law Revision Act 1890 (53 & 54 Vict. c. 33))
| Indentures of Apprenticeship, etc. Act 1821 (repealed) | 1 & 2 Geo. 4. c. 32 | 28 May 1821 |
An Act for declaring valid certain Indentures of Apprenticeship, and Certificates of Settlements of poor Persons in England. (Repealed by Statute Law Revision Act 1873 (36 & 37 Vict. c. 91))
| Lunacy (Ireland) Act 1821 (repealed) | 1 & 2 Geo. 4. c. 33 | 28 May 1821 |
An Act to make more effectual Provision for the Establishment of Asylums for the Lunatic Poor, and for the Custody of Insane Persons charged with Offences in Ireland. (Repealed for Northern Ireland by Mental Health (Northern Ireland) Act 1961 (c. 15 (N.I.)) and for the Republic of Ireland by Assisted Decision-Making (Capacity) Act 2015 (No. 64))
| Capital Punishment (Ireland) Act 1821 (repealed) | 1 & 2 Geo. 4. c. 34 | 28 May 1821 |
An Act to repeal so much of Two Acts, made in the Parliament of Ireland, in the Ninth Year of Queen Anne, (Note: Criminal Evidence Act 1710 (9 Anne c. 6 (I))) and in the Seventeenth Year of King George the Second, (Note: Shop Stealing and Robbery Act 1743 (17 Geo. 2. c. 6 (I))) as inflicts Capital Punishment on Persons guilty of stealing to the Amount of Five Shillings out of or from Shops, Warehouses and other Outbuildings and Places, and to provide more suitable and effectual Punishment for such Offences. (Repealed by Criminal Statutes (Ireland) Repeal Act 1828 (9 Geo. 4. c. 53))
| Conway Bridge Act 1821 | 1 & 2 Geo. 4. c. 35 | 28 May 1821 |
An Act for applying a certain Sum of Money out of the Consolidated Fund of the United Kingdom of Great Britain and Ireland, for the Purpose of building a Bridge over the River Conway, in the County of Carnarvon, and for imposing additional Rates of Postage on Letters and Packets conveyed over the said Bridge.
| Public Notaries (Ireland) Act 1821 (repealed) | 1 & 2 Geo. 4. c. 36 | 28 May 1821 |
An Act for the better Regulation of the Public Notaries in Ireland. (Repealed by Judicature (Northern Ireland) Act 1978 (c. 23))
| Customs Act 1821 (repealed) | 1 & 2 Geo. 4. c. 37 | 28 May 1821 |
An Act to repeal the Duties of Customs on the Importation into Great Britain of certain Sorts of Wood and Timber, and certain Drawbacks or Allowances in respect of such Duties, and to grant other Duties and Drawbacks in lieu thereof. (Repealed by Customs Law Repeal Act 1825 (6 Geo. 4. c. 105))
| Court of Session Act 1821 (repealed) | 1 & 2 Geo. 4. c. 38 | 28 May 1821 |
An Act for establishing Regulations respecting certain Parts, of the Proceedings in the Court of Session, and in the Court of Commissioners for Teinds, and respecting the Duties, Qualifications, and Emoluments of certain Clerks and other Officers of the said. Courts. (Repealed by Civil Litigation (Expenses and Group Proceedings) (Scotland) Act 2018 (asp 10))
| Admiralty Courts (Scotland) Act 1821 (repealed) | 1 & 2 Geo. 4. c. 39 | 28 May 1821 |
An Act for the better Regulation of the Courts of Admiralty in Scotland, and of certain Proceedings in the Court of Session connected therewith. (Repealed by Statute Law Revision Act 1873 (36 & 37 Vict. c. 91))
| Frauds by Bankrupts (Ireland) Act 1821 (repealed) | 1 & 2 Geo. 4. c. 40 | 28 May 1821 |
An Act to repeal so much of an Act, made in the Parliament of Ireland in the Eleventh and Twelfth Years of the Reign of King George the Third, (Note: Frauds by Bankrupts Act 1771 (11 & 12 Geo. 3. c. 8 (I))) for preventing Frauds committed by Bankrupts, as inflicts Capital Punishment on certain Offences therein specified; and to provide more suitable and effectual Punishment for such Offences. (Repealed by Irish Bankrupt and Insolvent Act 1857 (20 & 21 Vict. c. 60))
| Steam Engine Furnaces Act 1821 or the Steam Engines Furnaces Act 1821 (repealed) | 1 & 2 Geo. 4. c. 41 | 28 May 1821 |
An Act for giving greater facility in the Prosecution and abatement of Nuisances arising from Furnaces used and in the working of Steam Engines. (Repealed by Statute Law (Repeals) Act 1971 (c. 52))
| Militia Pay Act 1821 (repealed) | 1 & 2 Geo. 4. c. 42 | 28 May 1821 |
An Act to defray the Charge of the Pay, Clothing and contingent Expences of the Disembodied Militia in Great Britain; and to grant Allowances in certain Cases to Subaltern Officers, Adjutants, Quartermasters, Surgeons, Surgeons' Mates and Serjeant Majors of Militia, until the Twenty fifth Day of March One thousand eight hundred and twenty two. (Repealed by Statute Law Revision Act 1873 (36 & 37 Vict. c. 91))
| Militia Pay (No. 2) Act 1821 (repealed) | 1 & 2 Geo. 4. c. 43 | 28 May 1821 |
An Act to defray, until the Twenty fifth Day of June One thousand eight hundred and twenty-two, the Charge of the Pay and Clothing of the Militia of Ireland; and for making Allowances to Officers and Quartermasters of the said Militia during Peace. (Repealed by Statute Law Revision Act 1873 (36 & 37 Vict. c. 91))
| House of Commons Disqualifications Act 1821 or the House of Commons (Disqualification) Act 1821 (repealed) | 1 & 2 Geo. 4. c. 44 | 28 May 1821 |
An Act to exclude Persons holding certain Judicial Offices in Ireland, from being Members of the House of Commons. (Repealed by House of Commons Disqualification Act 1957 (5 & 6 Eliz. 2. c. 20))
| Improvements at Westminster Act 1821 | 1 & 2 Geo. 4. c. 45 | 8 June 1821 |
An Act to amend an Act of the Forty sixth Year of the Reign of His late Majesty King George the Third, (Note: Houses of Parliament Act 1806 (46 Geo. 3. c. 89)) for consolidating and rendering more effectual the several Acts for the Purchase of Buildings, and further Improvement of the Street and Places near to West minster Hall and the Two Houses of Parliament.
| Jurors at Assizes (England) Act 1821 (repealed) | 1 & 2 Geo. 4. c. 46 | 8 June 1821 |
An Act to regulate the Attendance of Jurors at the Assizes in certain Cases. (Repealed by Juries Act 1825 (6 Geo. 4. c. 50))
| Disfranchisement of Grampound (No. 2) Act 1821 (repealed) | 1 & 2 Geo. 4. c. 47 | 8 June 1821 |
An act to exclude the Borough of Grampound, in the County of Cornwall, from sending Burgesses to serve in Parliament; and to enable the County of York to send Two additional Knights to serve in Parliament, in lieu thereof. (Repealed by Statute Law Revision Act 1873 (36 & 37 Vict. c. 91))
| Solicitors (Ireland) Act 1821 (repealed) | 1 & 2 Geo. 4. c. 48 | 8 June 1821 |
An Act to amend the several Acts for the Regulation of Attornies and Solicitors. (Repealed by Statute Law Revision Act 1891 (54 & 55 Vict. c. 67))
| Navy Pay, etc. Act 1821 (repealed) | 1 & 2 Geo. 4. c. 49 | 8 June 1821 |
An Act for making further Regulations in respect to the Payment by Remittance Bill of the Wages of Petty Officers, Seamen and Marines, in the Royal Navy; and for extending the Provisions of an Act made in the Fifty fifth Year of His late Majesty, (Note: Wills, etc., of Seamen, etc. Act 1815 (55 Geo. 3. c. 60)) relating to the Execution of Letters of Attorney and Wills of Petty Officers, Seamen and Marines, in His Majesty's Navy. (Repealed by Pay of the Navy Act 1830 (11 Geo. 4 & 1 Will. 4. c. 20))
| Making, etc., of Bread Act 1821 (repealed) | 1 & 2 Geo. 4. c. 50 | 8 June 1821 |
An Act to alter and amend an Act made in the Fifty ninth Year of the Reign of His late Majesty King George the Third, intituled, "An Act to regulate the Making and Sale of Bread out of the City of London and the Liberties thereof, and beyond the Weekly Bills of Mortality and Ten Miles of the Royal Exchange, where no Assize is set; and for establishing other Provisions and Regulations relative thereto." (Note: Bread Act 1819 (59 Geo. 3. c. 36)) (Repealed by Statute Law Revision Act 1861 (24 & 25 Vict. c. 101))
| Rate of Interest Act 1821 (repealed) | 1 & 2 Geo. 4. c. 51 | 15 June 1821 |
An Act to explain an Act made in the Fourteenth Year of His late Majesty King George the Third, (Note: Legal Rate of Interest Act 1774 (14 Geo. 3. c. 79)) for explaining an Act made in the Twelfth Year of Queen Anne, (Note: Usury Act 1713 (13 Ann. c. 15)) intituled "An Act to reduce the Rate of Interest without any Prejudice to Parliamentary Securities." (Repealed by Rate of Interest Act 1822 (3 Geo. 4. c. 47))
| Duchy of Lancaster Act 1821 (repealed) | 1 & 2 Geo. 4. c. 52 | 15 June 1821 |
An Act to improve the Land Revenues of the Crown, and of His Majesty's Duchy of Lancaster, and for making Provisions and Regulations for the better Management thereof. (Repealed by Statute Law Revision Act 1873 (36 & 37 Vict. c. 91), Wild Creatures and Forest Laws Act 1971 (c. 47) and Statute Law (Repeals) Act 1977 (c. 18))
| Common Law Procedure (Ireland) Act 1821 (repealed) | 1 & 2 Geo. 4. c. 53 | 15 June 1821 |
An Act to regulate the Proceedings in the Civil Side of the Court of King's Bench, and also in the Court of Common Pleas, and in the Pleas or Common Law Side of the Court of Exchequer in Ireland. (Repealed by Judicature (Northern Ireland) Act 1978 (c. 23))
| Clerk of Assize (Ireland) Act 1821 (repealed) | 1 & 2 Geo. 4. c. 54 | 15 June 1821 |
An Act to regulate the Office of Clerk of Assize or Nisi Prius, or Judge's Registrar, in Ireland. (Repealed by Judicature (Northern Ireland) Act 1978 (c. 23))
| Stamps Act 1821 (repealed) | 1 & 2 Geo. 4. c. 55 | 23 June 1821 |
An Act to remove Doubts as to the Amount of Stamp Duties to be paid on Deeds and other Instruments, under the several Acts in force in Great Britain and Ireland respectively. (Repealed by Inland Revenue Repeal Act 1870 (33 & 34 Vict. c. 99))
| Sale of Workhouses Act 1821 (repealed) | 1 & 2 Geo. 4. c. 56 | 23 June 1821 |
An Act to amend an Act passed in the Twenty second Year of His late Majesty, (Note: Relief of the Poor Act 1782 (22 Geo. 3. c. 83)) for the better Relief Employment of the Poor. (Repealed by Statute Law Revision Act 1873 (36 & 37 Vict. c. 91))
| Prisons (Ireland) Act 1821 (repealed) | 1 & 2 Geo. 4. c. 57 | 23 June 1821 |
An Act to amend an Act, made in the Fiftieth Year of the Reign of His late Majesty King George the Third, (Note: Prisons (Ireland) Act 1810 (50 Geo. 3. c. 103)) relating to Prisons in Ireland. (Repealed by Prisons (Ireland) Act 1822 (3 Geo. 4. c. 64))
| Parliamentary Elections (Ireland) Act 1821 (repealed) | 1 & 2 Geo. 4. c. 58 | 23 June 1821 |
An Act to regulate the Expences of Elections of Members to serve in Parliament for Ireland. (Repealed by Representation of the People Act 1948 (11 & 12 Geo. 6. c. 65))
| Insolvent Debtors (Ireland) Act 1821 (repealed) | 1 & 2 Geo. 4. c. 59 | 23 June 1821 |
An Act for the Relief of Insolvent Debtors in Ireland. (Repealed by Statute Law Revision Act 1873 (36 & 37 Vict. c. 91))
| South Sea Trade Act 1821 (repealed) | 1 & 2 Geo. 4. c. 60 | 23 June 1821 |
An Act for exempting Ships in Ballast in the South Sea Trade from certain Tonnage Duties. (Repealed by Statute Law Revision Act 1861 (24 & 25 Vict. c. 101))
| East India Company Act 1821 (repealed) | 1 & 2 Geo. 4. c. 61 | 23 June 1821 |
An Act to regulate the Appropriation of unclaimed Shares of Prize Money belonging to Soldiers or Seamen in the Service of the East India Company. (Repealed by Statute Law Revision Act 1873 (36 & 37 Vict. c. 91))
| General Sessions of the Peace (Ireland) Act 1821 (repealed) | 1 & 2 Geo. 4. c. 62 | 23 June 1821 |
An Act to regulate the Times for holding the Sessions of the Peace, in the several Counties in Ireland. (Repealed by Judicature (Ireland) Act 1831 (1 & 2 Will. 4. c. 31))
| Justices of the Peace Act 1821 (repealed) | 1 & 2 Geo. 4. c. 63 | 2 July 1821 |
An Act to amend an Act, made in the Twenty eighth Year of the Reign of King George the Third, intituled "An Act to enable Justices of the Peace to act as such, in certain cases, out of the Limits of the Counties in which they actually are." (Note: Justices of the Peace Act 1788 (28 Geo. 3. c. 49)) (Repealed by Statute Law Revision Act 1874 (37 & 38 Vict. c. 35))
| Vagrants Act 1821 (repealed) | 1 & 2 Geo. 4. c. 64 | 2 July 1821 |
An Act to amend the Laws now in force relating to Vagrants, until the First Day of September One thousand eight hundred and twenty two. (Repealed by Statute Law Revision Act 1873 (36 & 37 Vict. c. 91))
| East India, etc., Trade Act 1821 (repealed) | 1 & 2 Geo. 4. c. 65 | 2 July 1821 |
An Act for the further Regulation of Trade to and from Places within the Limits of the Charter of the East India Company (except the Dominions of the Emperor of China), and Ports or Places beyond the Limits of the said Charter, belonging to any State or Country in Amity with His Majesty. (Repealed by Lascars Act 1823 (4 Geo. 4. c. 80))
| British North America Act 1821 or the Second Canada Jurisdiction Act 1821 (repealed) | 1 & 2 Geo. 4. c. 66 | 2 July 1821 |
An Act for regulating the Fur Trade, and establishing a Criminal and Civil Jurisdiction within certain Parts of North America. (Repealed by Statute Law Revision Act 1874 (37 & 38 Vict. c. 35), Statute Law Revision Act 1890 (53 & 54 Vict. c. 33) and Statute Law Revision Act 1950 (14 Geo. 6. c. 6))
| Drawbacks on Coals, etc. Act 1821 (repealed) | 1 & 2 Geo. 4. c. 67 | 2 July 1821 |
An Act for extending the Drawbacks on Coals used in Mines and Smelting Works within the Counties of Cornwall and Devon, and for allowing a Drawback of the Duties on Coals used in draining Coal Mines in the County of Pembroke. (Repealed by Customs Law Repeal Act 1825 (6 Geo. 4. c. 105))
| Public Coal Yards, Dublin, etc. Act 1821 (repealed) | 1 & 2 Geo. 4. c. 68 | 2 July 1821 |
An Act to repeal so much of several Acts to prevent the excessive Price of Coals, as relates to Coal Yards established at the Expence of the Public in Dublin and Cork. (Repealed by Statute Law Revision Act 1873 (36 & 37 Vict. c. 91))
| Ordnance Property Act 1821 (repealed) | 1 & 2 Geo. 4. c. 69 | 2 July 1821 |
An Act for vesting all Estates and Property, occupied for the Ordnance Service, in the principal Officers of the Ordnance; and for granting certain Powers to the said principal Officers. (Repealed by Defence Act 1842 (5 & 6 Vict. c. 94))
| National Debt Act 1821 (repealed) | 1 & 2 Geo. 4. c. 70 | 2 July 1821 |
An Act for raising a Loan of Thirteen Millions from the Commissioners for the Reduction of the National Debt. (Repealed by Statute Law Revision Act 1861 (24 & 25 Vict. c. 101))
| Exchequer Bills Act 1821 (repealed) | 1 & 2 Geo. 4. c. 71 | 2 July 1821 |
An Act for raising the Sum of Twenty nine Millions by Exchequer Bills, for the Service of the Year One thousand eight hundred and twenty one. (Repealed by Statute Law Revision Act 1873 (36 & 37 Vict. c. 91))
| Bank of Ireland Act 1821 | 1 & 2 Geo. 4. c. 72 | 2 July 1821 |
An Act to establish an Agreement with the Governor and Company of the Bank of Ireland, for advancing the Sum of Five hundred thousand Pounds Irish Currency; and to empower the said Governor and Company to enlarge the Capital Stock or Fund of the said Bank to Three Millions.
| Transfer of Public Funds Act 1821 (repealed) | 1 & 2 Geo. 4. c. 73 | 2 July 1821 |
An Act to permit for Three Years, the Transfer from certain Public Stocks or Funds in Ireland, to certain Public Stocks or Funds in Great Britain. (Repealed by Statute Law Revision Act 1870 (33 & 34 Vict. c. 69))
| Treasurer of the Navy Act 1821 (repealed) | 1 & 2 Geo. 4. c. 74 | 2 July 1821 |
An Act to repeal an Act, passed in the Fifty seventh Year of His late Majesty King George the Third, (Note: Treasurer of the Navy, etc. Act 1817 (57 Geo. 3. c. 121)) for regulating Payments to the Treasurer of the Navy under the Heads of Old Stores and Imprests, and to make other Provisions in lieu thereof. (Repealed by Treasurer of the Navy Act 1830 (11 Geo. 4 & 1 Will. 4. c. 42))
| Frauds by Boatmen, etc. Act 1821 (repealed) | 1 & 2 Geo. 4. c. 75 | 2 July 1821 |
An Act to continue and amend certain Acts for preventing Frauds and Depredations committed on Merchants, Shipowners, and Underwriters, by Boatmen and others; and also for remedying certain Defects relative to the Adjustment of Salvage in England, under an Act made in the Twelfth Year of Queen Anne. (Note: Stranded Ships Act 1713 (13 Ann. c. 21)) (Repealed by Statute Law Revision Act 1861 (24 & 25 Vict. c. 101))
| Cinque Ports Act 1821 | 1 & 2 Geo. 4. c. 76 | 2 July 1821 |
An Act to continue and amend certain Acts for preventing the various Frauds and Depredations committed on Merchants, Shipowners, and Underwriters, by Boatmen and others, within the jurisdiction of the Cinque Ports; and also for remedying certain Defects relative to the Adjustment of Salvage, under a Statute made in the Twelfth Year of the Reign of Her late Majesty Queen Anne.
| Gaol Fees Abolition (Ireland) Act 1821 (repealed) | 1 & 2 Geo. 4. c. 77 | 2 July 1821 |
An Act to abolish the Payment, by Prisoners in Ireland, of Gaol Fees, and all other Fees relating to the Commitment, Continuance, Trial or Discharge of such Prisoners, and to prevent Abuses by Gaolers, Bailiffs and other Officers. (Repealed by Costs in Criminal Cases Act (Northern Ireland) 1968 (c. 10 (N.I.)))
| Bills of Exchange Act 1821 (repealed) | 1 & 2 Geo. 4. c. 78 | 2 July 1821 |
An Act to regulate Acceptances of Bills of Exchange. (Repealed for Ireland by Bills of Exchange (Ireland) Act 1828 (9 Geo. 4. c. 24) and for England and Wales and Scotland by Bills of Exchange Act 1882 (45 & 46 Vict. c. 61))
| White Herring Fishery (Scotland) Act 1821 (repealed) | 1 & 2 Geo. 4. c. 79 | 2 July 1821 |
An Act to repeal certain Bounties granted for the Encouragement of the Deep Sea British White Herring Fishery, and to make further Regulations relating to the said Fishery. (Repealed by Inshore Fishing (Scotland) Act 1984 (c. 26))
| Treasury Bills (Ireland) Act 1821 (repealed) | 1 & 2 Geo. 4. c. 80 | 2 July 1821 |
An Act for raising the Sum of One Million British Currency, by Treasury Bills in Ireland, for the Service of the Year One thousand eight hundred and twenty. (Repealed by Statute Law Revision Act 1873 (36 & 37 Vict. c. 91))
| Registry of Wool Act 1821 (repealed) | 1 & 2 Geo. 4. c. 81 | 2 July 1821 |
An Act to amend so much of an Act of the Twenty eighth Year of His late Majesty (Note: Exportation (No. 2) Act 1788 (28 Geo. 3 c. 38)) as requires a Registry of Wool sent Coastwise. (Repealed by Statute Law Revision Act 1873 (36 & 37 Vict. c. 91))
| Drawback on Malt Act 1821 (repealed) | 1 & 2 Geo. 4. c. 82 | 2 July 1821 |
An Act for allowing to Distillers of Spirits for Home Consumption in Scotland, a Drawback of a Portion of the Duty on Malt used by them; and for the further Prevention of smuggling of Spirits on the Borders of Scotland and England. (Repealed by Statute Law Revision Act 1873 (36 & 37 Vict. c. 91))
| Duty on Malt Act 1821 (repealed) | 1 & 2 Geo. 4. c. 83 | 2 July 1821 |
An Act for further reducing until the Fifth Day of July One thousand eight hundred and twenty two, the Duty on Malt made from Bear or Bigg only, for Home Consumption in Scotland. (Repealed by Statute Law Revision Act 1873 (36 & 37 Vict. c. 91))
| Duties on Wood, etc. (Great Britain) Act 1821 (repealed) | 1 & 2 Geo. 4. c. 84 | 2 July 1821 |
An Act to grant Duties of Customs on certain Articles of Wood imported into Great Britain, in lieu of former Duties; and to amend an Act made in the Fifty ninth Year of His late Majesty, (Note: Customs (No. 3) Act 1819 (59 Geo. 3. c. 52)) for granting certain Duties of Customs in Great Britain. (Repealed by Customs Law Repeal Act 1825 (6 Geo. 4. c. 105))
| County Rates Act 1821 (repealed) | 1 & 2 Geo. 4. c. 85 | 2 July 1821 |
An Act to explain and amend several Acts relating the assessing, levying and collecting the County Rates. (Repealed by County Rates Act 1852 (15 & 16 Vict. c. 81))
| Caversham Rectory Act 1821 (repealed) | 1 & 2 Geo. 4. c. 86 | 2 July 1821 |
An Act for amending an Act passed in the First Year of His present Majesty, (Note: Caversham Rectory Act 1820 (1 Geo. 4. c. 114)) for enabling William Blackall Simonds Esquire, to sell or mortgage his Estate and Interest in the Impropriate Rectory of Caversham, in the County of Oxford, free from the Claims of the Crown. (Repealed by Statute Law Revision Act 1950 (14 Geo. 6. c. 6))
| Importation and Exportation Act 1821 (repealed) | 1 & 2 Geo. 4. c. 87 | 10 July 1821 |
An Act to repeal certain Acts, passed in the Thirty first, (Note: Importation and Exportation (No. 2) Act 1791 (31 Geo. 3. c. 30)) Thirty third, (Note: Importation and Exportation (No. 2) Act 1793 (33 Geo. 3. c. 65)) Forty fourth (Note: Importation and Exportation Act 1804 (44 Geo. 3. c. 109)) and Forty fifth (Note: Importation and Exportation (No. 2) Act 1805 (45 Geo. 3. c. 86)) Years of His late Majesty King George the Third, for regulating the Importation and Exportation of Corn, Grain, Meal and Flour into and from Great Britain, and to make further Provisions in lieu thereof. (Repealed by Average Price of Corn Act 1827 (7 & 8 Geo. 4. c. 58))
| Rescue Act 1821 (repealed) | 1 & 2 Geo. 4. c. 88 | 10 July 1821 |
An Act for the Amendment of the Law of Rescue. (Repealed for Scotland by Police (Scotland) Act 1956 (4 & 5 Eliz. 2. c. 26) and for England and Wales and Northern Ireland by Statute Law Revision Act 1888 (51 & 52 Vict. c. 3), Statute Law Revision (No. 2) Act 1890 (53 & 54 Vict. c. 51) and Criminal Law Act 1967 (c. 58))
| London Wharves Act 1821 (repealed) | 1 & 2 Geo. 4. c. 89 | 10 July 1821 |
An Act to repeal so much of an Act of the Twenty second Year of His Majesty King Charles the Second, (Note: Rebuilding of London Act 1670 (22 Cha. 2. c. 11)) as restrains the Proprietors of Wharfs between London Bridge and the Temple from erecting any Buildings or Enclosures thereon. (Repealed by Statute Law (Repeals) Act 1993 (c. 50))
| Revenue (Ireland) Act 1821 (repealed) | 1 & 2 Geo. 4. c. 90 | 10 July 1821 |
An Act to appoint Commissioners for inquiring into the Collection and Management of the Revenue in Ireland, and the several Establishments connected therewith. (Repealed by Statute Law Revision Act 1873 (36 & 37 Vict. c. 91))
| Silk, etc., Bounties Act 1821 (repealed) | 1 & 2 Geo. 4. c. 91 | 10 July 1821 |
An Act to grant certain Bounties on the Exportation of Stuffs made of Silk mixed with Mohair, and of Stuffs made of Mohair mixed with Worsted, the Manufacture of Great Britain or Ireland. (Repealed by Statute Law Revision Act 1861 (24 & 25 Vict. c. 101))
| Exchange of Lands of Charities Act 1821 (repealed) | 1 & 2 Geo. 4. c. 92 | 10 July 1821 |
An Act to authorize the Exchange of Lands, Tenements, or Hereditaments, subject to Trusts for Charitable Purposes, for other Lands, Tenements, or Hereditaments. (Repealed by Statute Law Revision Act 1873 (36 & 37 Vict. c. 91))
| Property Occupied for Naval Service, etc. Act 1821 (repealed) | 1 & 2 Geo. 4. c. 93 | 10 July 1821 |
An Act for vesting all Estates and Property, occupied by or for the Naval Service of this Kingdom, in the principal Officers and Commissioners of His Majesty's Navy, and for granting certain Powers to the said principal Officers and Commissioners. (Repealed by Admiralty, &c. Acts Repeal Act 1865 (28 & 29 Vict. c. 112))
| Importation (No. 2) Act 1821 (repealed) | 1 & 2 Geo. 4. c. 94 | 10 July 1821 |
An Act to regulate the Importation of Rum into Islands of Jersey, Guernsey, Alderney and Sark. (Repealed by Customs Law Repeal Act 1825 (6 Geo. 4. c. 105))
| Growing Produce of Consolidated Fund Act 1821 (repealed) | 1 & 2 Geo. 4. c. 95 | 10 July 1821 |
An Act to continue until the Fifth Day of July One thousand eight hundred and twenty two, an Act of the Fifty ninth Year of His late Majesty, (Note: Produce of Consolidated Fund Act 1819 (59 Geo. 3. c. 19)) for rendering the growing Produce of the Consolidated Fund of the United Kingdom, arising in Great Britain, available for the Public Service. (Repealed by Statute Law Revision Act 1873 (36 & 37 Vict. c. 91))
| British Spirits Duty Act 1821 (repealed) | 1 & 2 Geo. 4. c. 96 | 10 July 1821 |
An Act for charging a Duty on British Spirits brought into certain Parts of the District of Lisburne in Ireland. (Repealed by Statute Law Revision Act 1861 (24 & 25 Vict. c. 101))
| Coasting Trade (Great Britain) Act 1821 (repealed) | 1 & 2 Geo. 4. c. 97 | 10 July 1821 |
An Act to amend several Acts relating to the Coasting Trade of Great Britain. (Repealed by Customs Law Repeal Act 1825 (6 Geo. 4. c. 105))
| Greenwich Hospital Out-pensioners Act 1821 (repealed) | 1 & 2 Geo. 4. c. 98 | 10 July 1821 |
An Act to enable the Commissioners or Governors of Greenwich Hospital to continue to provide for the Payment of Out Pensioners of the said Hospital. (Repealed by Greenwich Hospital Outpensions, etc. Act 1829 (10 Geo. 4. c. 26))
| Proceeds of Captured Slavers Act 1821 (repealed) | 1 & 2 Geo. 4. c. 99 | 10 July 1821 |
An Act for the Appropriation of certain Proceeds arising from the Capture of Vessels and Cargoes, the Property of the Subjects of the Kings of Spain, Portugal, and the Netherlands, taken and seized in Violation of the Conventions made with those States, and for granting Bounties upon Slaves captured in such Vessels; and also for granting Indemnity to the Captors of certain Vessels taken in the Prosecution of the Slave Trade. (Repealed by Statute Law Revision Act 1861 (24 & 25 Vict. c. 101))
| Hops Act 1821 (repealed) | 1 & 2 Geo. 4. c. 100 | 10 July 1821 |
An Act for regulating the Exportation of Hops to Foreign Parts, and allowing a Drawback of the Excise Duty paid thereon. (Repealed by Statute Law Revision Act 1873 (36 & 37 Vict. c. 91))
| Exportation Act 1821 (repealed) | 1 & 2 Geo. 4. c. 101 | 10 July 1821 |
An Act to extend to Ireland an Act of the last Session of Parliament, for granting an additional Bounty on the Exportation of certain Silk Manufactures, and to continue the same until the Fifth Day of July One thousand eight hundred and twenty two. (Repealed by Statute Law Revision Act 1873 (36 & 37 Vict. c. 91))
| Exportation, etc. Act 1821 (repealed) | 1 & 2 Geo. 4. c. 102 | 10 July 1821 |
An Act for altering the Drawback on Acetous Acid exported; and for exempting Tiles made for draining Lands from Duty. (Repealed by Statute Law Revision Act 1861 (24 & 25 Vict. c. 101))
| Goods Sold Under Warehousing Acts Act 1821 (repealed) | 1 & 2 Geo. 4. c. 103 | 10 July 1821 |
An Act to authorize Collectors of the Customs in Ireland to bring to Account the Proceeds of Goods sold under the Provisions of the Warehousing Acts. (Repealed by Customs Law Repeal Act 1825 (6 Geo. 4. c. 105))
| Importation, Isle of Man Act 1821 (repealed) | 1 & 2 Geo. 4. c. 104 | 10 July 1821 |
An Act to amend an Act of the last Session of Parliament, (Note: Import Duties etc. (Isle of Man) Act 1820 (1 Geo. 4. c. 61)) for regulating the Trade of the Isle of Man, so far as relates to the Quantity of Muscovado Sugar to be imported into the said Island. (Repealed by Customs Law Repeal Act 1825 (6 Geo. 4. c. 105))
| Excise Act 1821 (repealed) | 1 & 2 Geo. 4. c. 105 | 10 July 1821 |
An Act for amending the Laws of Excise relating to warehoused Goods. (Repealed by Statute Law Revision Act 1861 (24 & 25 Vict. c. 101))
| Customs (No. 2) Act 1821 (repealed) | 1 & 2 Geo. 4. c. 106 | 10 July 1821 |
An Act to continue, until the First Day of July One thousand eight hundred and twenty four, several Acts of His late Majesty, respecting the Duties of Customs payable on Merchandize imported into Great Britain and Ireland from any Place within the Limits of the East India Company's Charter; and to increase the Duties payable on the Importation of Sugar from the East Indies until the Twenty fifth Day of March One thousand eight hundred and twenty three in Great Britain, and until the First Day of July One thousand eight hundred and twenty four in Ireland. (Repealed by Statute Law Revision Act 1873 (36 & 37 Vict. c. 91))
| Lands at Gillingham Act 1821 | 1 & 2 Geo. 4. c. 107 | 10 July 1821 |
An Act to repeal so much of an Act passed in the Fifty sixth Year of His late Majesty, (Note: Lands at Sheerness and Chatham Act 1816 (56 Geo. 3. c. 74)) as relates to the Purchase of Lands, Tenements, and Hereditaments, at Sheerness, in the County of Kent, and to vest certain Lands and Hereditaments at Gillingham in the said County, in Trustees, to be appropriated to the Public Service in the Department of the Navy.
| National Debt (No. 2) Act 1821 (repealed) | 1 & 2 Geo. 4. c. 108 | 10 July 1821 |
An Act to provide for the Charge of the Addition to the Public Funded Debt of the United Kingdom of Great Britain and Ireland, for the Service of the Year One thousand eight hundred and twenty one. (Repealed by Statute Law Revision Act 1870 (33 & 34 Vict. c. 69))
| Duties on Tobacco Act 1821 (repealed) | 1 & 2 Geo. 4. c. 109 | 10 July 1821 |
An Act for better securing the Duties of Excise on Tobacco. (Repealed by Tobacco Act 1840 (3 & 4 Vict. c. 18))
| Horse Duties Act 1821 (repealed) | 1 & 2 Geo. 4. c. 110 | 10 July 1821 |
An Act for repealing the Duties imposed on Husbandry Horses, and to make perpetual several Acts for reducing the Duties on certain Horses and Mules. (Repealed by Statute Law Revision Act 1861 (24 & 25 Vict. c. 101))
| Public Works Loans Act 1821 (repealed) | 1 & 2 Geo. 4. c. 111 | 10 July 1821 |
An Act to empower the Commissioners in Great Britain for the Execution of several Acts for authorizing the Issue of Exchequer Bills for carrying on of Public Works and Fisheries, and Employment of the Poor, to extend the Time for the Payment of certain Advances under the said Acts. (Repealed by Statute Law Revision Act 1873 (36 & 37 Vict. c. 91))
| Stamp Duties in Law Proceedings (Ireland) Act 1821 (repealed) | 1 & 2 Geo. 4. c. 112 | 10 July 1821 |
An Act to grant for the Term of Five Years additional Stamp Duties on certain Proceedings in the Courts of Law and to repeal certain other Stamp Duties in Ireland. (Repealed by Statute Law Revision Act 1873 (36 & 37 Vict. c. 91) and Statute Law Revision Act 1953 (2 & 3 Eliz. 2. c. 5))
| Taxes Act 1821 (repealed) | 1 & 2 Geo. 4. c. 113 | 10 July 1821 |
An Act to continue several Acts for the Relief of Persons compounding for Assessed Taxes from an annual Assessment, for a further Term; and to amend the Acts relating to Assessments and Compositions of Assessed Taxes. (Repealed by Taxes Management Act 1880 (43 & 44 Vict. c. 19))
| Lunatics Act 1821 (repealed) | 1 & 2 Geo. 4. c. 114 | 10 July 1821 |
An Act for the Conveyance, Surrender, and Assignment of Estates in Fee, for Lives, or Terms of Years, which shall be vested in Trust, or by way of Mortgage, in Idiots and Lunatics, not having been found such by Inquisition. (Repealed by Infants, Lunatics, etc. Act 1825 (6 Geo. 4. c. 74))
| Bankruptcy Court Act 1821 (repealed) | 1 & 2 Geo. 4. c. 115 | 10 July 1821 |
An Act to repeal so much of an Act, of the Fifth Year of the Reign of His late Majesty King George the Second, (Note: Bankrupts Act 1731 (5 Geo. 2. c. 30)) relating to Bankrupts, as requires the Meetings under Commissions of Bankrupt to be holden in the Guildhall of the City of London; and for building Offices in the said City for the Meetings of the Com missioners; and for the more regular Transaction of Business in Bankruptcy. (Repealed by Bankruptcy Repeal and Insolvent Court Act 1869 (32 & 33 Vict. c. 83))
| Customs (No. 3) Act 1821 (repealed) | 1 & 2 Geo. 4. c. 116 | 10 July 1821 |
An Act to empower the Commissioners of the Treasury to grant, until the End of the next Session of Parliament, a limited Provision to certain discharged Officers of the Customs. (Repealed by Statute Law Revision Act 1873 (36 & 37 Vict. c. 91))
| Foundling Hospital, Dublin Act 1821 (repealed) | 1 & 2 Geo. 4. c. 117 | 10 July 1821 |
An Act to continue an Act of the Fiftieth Year of the Reign of His late Majesty King George the Third, (Note: Dublin Foundling Hospital Act 1810 (50 Geo. 3. c. cxcii)) for the better Management of the Foundling Hospital in Dublin. (Repealed by Statute Law Revision Act 1873 (36 & 37 Vict. c. 91))
| Police Magistrates, Metropolitan Act 1821 (repealed) | 1 & 2 Geo. 4. c. 118 | 10 July 1821 |
An Act for the more effectual Administration of the Office of a Justice of the Peace in and near the Metropolis; and for the more effectual Prevention of Depredations on the River Thames and its Vicinity, for One Year. (Repealed by Statute Law Revision Act 1873 (36 & 37 Vict. c. 91))
| Provisions for Duke of Clarence Act 1821 (repealed) | 1 & 2 Geo. 4. c. 119 | 11 July 1821 |
An Act for enabling His Majesty to make further Provision for His Royal Highness the Duke of Clarence. (Repealed by Statute Law Revision Act 1873 (36 & 37 Vict. c. 91))
| Lotteries Act 1821 (repealed) | 1 & 2 Geo. 4. c. 120 | 11 July 1821 |
An Act for granting to His Majesty a Sum of Money to be raised by Lotteries. (Repealed by Statute Law Revision Act 1861 (24 & 25 Vict. c. 101))
| Commissariat Accounts Act 1821 (repealed) | 1 & 2 Geo. 4. c. 121 | 11 July 1821 |
An act to alter and abolish certain Forms of Proceedings in the Exchequer and Audit Office, relative to Public Accountants, and for making further Provisions for the Purpose of facilitating and expediting the passing of Public Accounts in Great Britain; and to render perpetual and amend an Act passed in the Fifty fourth Year of His late Majesty, (Note: Accounts of Colonial Revenues Act 1814 (54 Geo. 3. c. 184)) for the effectual Examination of the Accounts of certain Colonial Revenues. (Repealed by Statute Law (Repeals) Act 1973 (c. 39))
| Appropriation Act 1821 (repealed) | 1 & 2 Geo. 4. c. 122 | 11 July 1821 |
An act for applying certain Monies therein mentioned for the Service of the Year One thousand eight hundred and twenty one; and for farther appropriating the Supplies granted in this Session of Parliament. (Repealed by Statute Law Revision Act 1873 (36 & 37 Vict. c. 91))
| Land Tax Commissioners Act 1821 (repealed) | 1 & 2 Geo. 4. c. 123 | 2 July 1821 |
An act for appointing Commissioners for carrying into Execution an Act or this Session of Parliament, (Note: Duties on Malt, etc. Act 1821 (1 & 2 Geo. 4. c. 3)) for granting to His Majesty a Duty on Pensions and Offices in England; and an Act, made in the Thirty eighth Year of His late Majesty, (Note: Land Tax Act 1797 (38 Geo. 3. c. 5)) for granting an Aid to His Majesty by a Land Tax to be raised in Great Britain, for the Service of the Year One thousand seven hundred and ninety eight. (Repealed by Statute Law Revision Act 1873 (36 & 37 Vict. c. 91))

=== Local acts ===
| Short title | Citation | Royal assent |
Long title
| Tadcaster and Otley Road Act 1821 (repealed) | 1 & 2 Geo. 4. c. i | 23 February 1821 |
An Act to continue the Term and alter and enlarge the Powers of several Acts (Note: Tadcaster and Otley Road Act 1753 (26 Geo. 2. c. 64)) (Note: Tadcaster and Otley Road Act 1771 (11 Geo. 3. c. 64)) (Note: Tadcaster and Otley Road Act 1801 (41 Geo. 3. (U.K.) c. i)) passed for repairing the Road from the Town of Tadcaster to the Town of Otley, in the County of York. (Repealed by Tadcaster and Otley Road Act 1842 (5 & 6 Vict. c. xciii))
| Northumberland Gaol and County Offices Act 1821 (repealed) | 1 & 2 Geo. 4. c. ii | 24 March 1821 |
An Act to enable His Majesty's Justices of the Peace acting for the County of Northumberland, to build a Common Gaol, House of Correction and Sessions House for the said County, with suitable, convenient and proper Offices, and other Accommodations to the same respectively; and for other Purposes relating thereto. (Repealed by Statute Law (Repeals) Act 2008 (c. 12))
| Leicester Gas Act 1821 (repealed) | 1 & 2 Geo. 4. c. iii | 24 March 1821 |
An Act for lighting with Gas the Borough of Leicester, in the County of Leicester, and the Liberties, Precincts and Suburbs thereof. (Repealed by Leicester Gas Act 1860 (23 & 24 Vict. c. v))
| Bristol Gas Act 1821 (repealed) | 1 & 2 Geo. 4. c. iv | 24 March 1821 |
An Act to enlarge the Powers and Provisions of an Act of His late Majesty, (Note: Bristol Gas Act 1819 (59 Geo. 3. c. ii)) for lighting with Gas the City of Bristol, and certain Parishes adjacent thereto, by enabling the Bristol Gas Light Company to raise a further Sum of Money for carrying the Purposes of the said Act into Execution. (Repealed by Bristol United Gaslight Company's Act 1853 (16 & 17 Vict. c. lxxxiv))
| Road from Leeds to Wakefield Act 1821 | 1 & 2 Geo. 4. c. v | 24 March 1821 |
An Act for amending and repairing the Road from Leeds to Wakefield, in the County of York.
| Gloucester and Clay Pitts Road Act 1821 (repealed) | 1 & 2 Geo. 4. c. vi | 24 March 1821 |
An Act to enlarge the Term and Powers of Two Acts of His late Majesty, (Note: Gloucester Roads Act 1779 (19 Geo. 3. c. 93)) (Note: Road from Gloucester to the Bristol Road Act 1800 (39 & 40 Geo. 3. c. xcvi)) for repairing and widening the Road from a Bridge over a Stream called Sudbrook, near the City of Gloucester, to the Nine Mile Stone on the Bristol Road, near the Clay Pitts, in the County of Gloucester, and for extending the Powers thereof to the Entrance of the City of Gloucester. (Repealed by Statute Law (Repeals) Act 2013 (c. 2))
| Thirsk and Masham Road Act 1821 | 1 & 2 Geo. 4. c. vii | 24 March 1821 |
An Act for amending and repairing the Road from Thirsk, over Skipton Bridge, to Hutton Moor, and through Ainderby, Quernhow and Nosterfield, to Masham in the North Riding of the County of York.
| Road from Leicester to Ashby-de-la-Zouch Act 1821 (repealed) | 1 & 2 Geo. 4. c. viii | 24 March 1821 |
An Act for continuing the Term, and altering and enlarging the Powers of several Acts (Note: Leicester Roads Act 1753 (26 Geo. 2. c. 46)) (Note: Leicester Roads Act 1779 (19 Geo. 3. c. 90)) (Note: Leicester and Ashby-de-la-Zouch Road Act 1800 (39 & 40 Geo. 3. c. ii)) passed for repairing the Road from the Borough of Leicester, in the County of Leicester, to the Town of Ashby de la Zouch, in the said County. (Repealed by Leicester and Ashby-de-la-Zouch Road Act 1842 (5 & 6 Vict. c. lxxiv))
| Roads from Leicester to Narborough and to Hinckley Act 1821 (repealed) | 1 & 2 Geo. 4. c. ix | 24 March 1821 |
An Act for continuing the Term, and altering and enlarging the Powers of an Act of His late Majesty's Reign; (Note: Leicester and Narborough and Hinckley Roads Act 1800 (39 & 40 Geo. 3. c. iii)) for repairing the Roads from the Borough of Leicester, in the County of Leicester, to the Town of Narborough; and from the said Borough of Leicester to the Town of Earl Shilton, and from the said Town of Earl Shilton to the Town of Hinckley, in the said County. (Repealed by Roads from Leicester to Narborough and to Hinckley Act 1842 (5 & 6 Vict. c. lxx))
| Hexham and Alston Road Act 1821 (repealed) | 1 & 2 Geo. 4. c. x | 24 March 1821 |
An Act for more effectually repairing the Road from Summerrod's Bar, near Hexham, in the County of Northumberland, to Alston, in the County of Cumberland. (Repealed by Durham, Cumberland, Northumberland and North Yorkshire Roads and Tyne Bridges Act 1824 (5 Geo. 4. c. xxxiv))
| Ripon and Pateley Bridge Road Act 1821 | 1 & 2 Geo. 4. c. xi | 24 March 1821 |
An Act for enlarging the Term and Powers of several Acts of King George the Second, (Note: Ripon and Pateley Bridge Road Act 1756 (29 Geo. 2. c. 83)) and of His late Majesty King George the Third, (Note: Yorkshire Roads Act 1780 (20 Geo. 3. c. 86)) (Note: Ripon and Pateley Bridge Road Act 1800 (39 & 40 Geo. 3. c. xxix)) for repairing the High Road from the Borough of Ripon, by Ingram Bank, to the Town of Pateley Bridge, in the County of York.
| Wells (Somerset) Roads and Improvement Act 1821 | 1 & 2 Geo. 4. c. xii | 24 March 1821 |
An Act for more effectually repairing and improving certain Roads leading to and from the City or Borough of Wells, in the County of Somerset; and for paving, cleansing, lighting, watching and watering the said Roads, and the Streets, Lanes and public Passages within the said City or Borough, the Liberty of Saint Andrew, and Suburbs of the said City or Borough; and removing and preventing Nuisances and Annoyances thereon.
| Stratford-upon-Avon and Bradley Brook Roads Act 1821 | 1 & 2 Geo. 4. c. xiii | 24 March 1821 |
An Act for repairing the Roads from Stratford upon Avon in the County of Warwick, through Alcester and Feckenham, to Bradley Brook in the County of Worcester, and other Roads therein mentioned in the same Counties.
| Lewes Roads Act 1821 (repealed) | 1 & 2 Geo. 4. c. xiv | 6 April 1821 |
An Act for more effectually making, repairing and improving the Roads from the Town of Lewes through Off ham to Witch Cross, from the Cliffe near Lewes aforesaid through Uckfield to Witch Cross aforesaid, and from the Cliffe aforesaid to Burwash, all in the County of Sussex. (Repealed by Roads from Lewes Act 1830 (11 Geo. 4 & 1 Will. 4. c. lxxxii))
| Roads from Liverpool Act 1821 (repealed) | 1 & 2 Geo. 4. c. xv | 6 April 1821 |
An Act for more effectually repairing and amending the Roads from Liverpool to Prescot, Ashton and Warrington, and other Roads therein mentioned, in the County Palatine of Lancaster. (Repealed by Liverpool, Prescot, Ashton and Warrington Roads Act 1831 (1 & 2 Will. 4. c. xxix))
| Skipton and Knaresborough Road Act 1821 (repealed) | 1 & 2 Geo. 4. c. xvi | 6 April 1821 |
An Act for continuing the Term, and altering and enlarging the Powers granted by Two Acts of His late Majesty, (Note: Yorks Roads (No. 5) Act 1777 (17 Geo. 3. c. 102)) (Note: Skipton and Knaresborough Road Act 1799 (39 Geo. 3. c. lxxviii)) for repairing and widening the Road from Skipton, to the Turnpike Road leading from Leeds to Ripon, near Ockbeck, in the Township of Bilton with Harrogate, and from thence to communicate with the Road leading from Knaresborough to Wetherby, in the West Riding of the County of York. (Repealed by Annual Turnpike Acts Continuance Act 1876 (39 & 40 Vict. c. 39))
| Roads from Wadesmill to Barley and Royston Act 1821 | 1 & 2 Geo. 4. c. xvii | 6 April 1821 |
An Act for continuing and amending Four Acts of Their late Majesties King George the Second (Note: Hertfordshire Roads Act 1732 (6 Geo. 2. c. 24)) (Note: Hertfordshire Roads Act 1742 (16 Geo. 2. c. 16)) and King George the Third, (Note: Hertford Roads Act 1762 (2 Geo. 3. c. 48)) (Note: Wadesmill and Royston Road Act 1796 (36 Geo. 3. c. 129)) for repairing the Roads leading from Wades Mill, in the County of Hertford, to Barley and Royston, in the said County.
| Road from Hurdlow House to Manchester Act 1821 (repealed) | 1 & 2 Geo. 4. c. xviii | 6 April 1821 |
An Act for more effectually repairing and improving the Roads from Hurdlow House, through Buxton in the County of Derby, and Stockport in the County Palatine of Chester, to Manchester in the County Palatine of Lancaster, and other Roads therein mentioned, in the said Counties. (Repealed by Roads from Hurdlow House to Manchester Act 1824 (5 Geo. 4. c. x))
| Ilchester Roads Act 1821 (repealed) | 1 & 2 Geo. 4. c. xix | 6 April 1821 |
An Act for continuing the Term, and altering and enlarging the Powers of an Act of His late Majesty King George the Third, (Note: Ilchester Roads Act 1800 (39 & 40 Geo. 3. c. vii)) for keeping in Repair several Roads leading from the Town of Ivelchester, in the County of Somerset. (Repealed by Yeovil and Ilchester Turnpike Trusts Act 1852 (15 & 16 Vict. c. cxiii))
| Road from Denbigh to Ruthland Act 1821 | 1 & 2 Geo. 4. c. xx | 6 April 1821 |
An Act for continuing the Term and altering and enlarging the Powers of Two Acts of the Reign of His late Majesty King George the Third, (Note: Denbigh to Ruthland Road Act 1781 (21 Geo. 3. c. 80)) (Note: Denbigh and Ruthland Road Act 1800 (39 & 40 Geo. 3. c. xxx)) for repairing the Road from Denbigh to Saint Asaph, and from thence to Ruthland, in the Counties of Denbigh and Flint.
| St. Marylebone Churches Act 1821 (repealed) | 1 & 2 Geo. 4. c. xxi | 6 April 1821 |
An Act to enable the Vestrymen of the Parish of Saint Mary le bone, in the County of Middlesex, to effectuate the building of Four District Churches in the said Parish, and for other Purposes relating thereto. (Repealed by London Government (Borough of St. Marylebone) Order in Council 1901 (SR&O 1901/272))
| Gloucester Markets and Improvement Act 1821 | 1 & 2 Geo. 4. c. xxii | 6 April 1821 |
An Act for establishing a proper Place for holding Markets and Fairs for the Sale of Live Stock in the City of Gloucester and the Suburbs thereof, and for opening convenient Avenues thereto, and for watching and otherwise improving the said City.
| Sutherland Roads, Bridges and Statute Labour Act 1821 (repealed) | 1 & 2 Geo. 4. c. xxiii | 6 April 1821 |
An Act for more effectually converting into Money the Statute Labour of the County of Sutherland, and for more effectually making and maintaining Roads therein, to which the Statute Labour is applicable, and increasing the Amount of Bridge Money leviable within the same. (Repealed by Sutherland Roads Act 1843 (6 & 7 Vict. c. lxxxi))
| St. Pancras Parish Church and Burial Ground Act 1821 (repealed) | 1 & 2 Geo. 4. c. xxiv | 6 April 1821 |
An Act for repealing an Act of the Thirty Second Year of His late Majesty, (Note: Saint Pancras Church Act 1792 (32 Geo. 3. c. 66)) for providing an additional Burying Ground for the Parish of Saint Pancras, in the County of Middlesex; and for altering and enlarging the Powers of an Act of the Fifty sixth Year of His late Majesty, (Note: St. Pancras Parish Church and Parochial Chapel Act 1816 (56 Geo. 3. c. xxxix)) for building a new Parish Church and Chapel for the said Parish. (Repealed by St. Pancras Ecclesiastical Regulation Act 1868 (31 & 32 Vict. c. clx))
| Basingstoke and Lobcombe Corner Road Act 1821 (repealed) | 1 & 2 Geo. 4. c. xxv | 19 April 1821 |
An Act for more effectually repairing and widening the Road from Basingstoke, through Wortin, Overton, Whitchurch, Hurstbourne Priors, Andover and Middle Wallop, in the County of Southampton, to a Place called Lobcomb Corner, in the Parish of Winterslow, in the County of Wilts, and other Roads in the County of Southampton. (Repealed by Andover and Basingstoke Road Act 1840 (3 & 4 Vict. c. xxxi))
| Henley-on-Thames, Dorchester and Oxford Roads Act 1821 (repealed) | 1 & 2 Geo. 4. c. xxvi | 19 April 1821 |
An Act for more effectually repairing the Roads leading from Henley Bridge, in the County of Oxford, to Dorchester Bridge, and from thence to Culham Bridge, and to a Place called Milestone, in the Road leading to Magdalen Bridge, in the said County. (Repealed by Henley-upon-Thames, Dorchester and Oxford Road Act 1841 (4 & 5 Vict. c. c))
| Road from Broil Park to Battle Act 1821 | 1 & 2 Geo. 4. c. xxvii | 19 April 1821 |
An Act for more effectually making, repairing and improving the Road from near the Place where the Broil Park Gate formerly stood to the Horsebridge Turnpike Road on the Dicker, and from the Blacksmith's Shop in Horsebridge Street to the Town of Battle, in the County of Sussex.
| Road from North Queensferry to Perth and Dunfermline Act 1821 (repealed) | 1 & 2 Geo. 4. c. xxviii | 19 April 1821 |
An Act to consolidate an Act (Note: Road from North Queensferry to Perth Act 1809 (49 Geo. 3. c. xxxi)) for making and repairing the Road leading from the North Queensferry in the County of Fife to the City of Perth and to the Town of Dunfermline, with an Act (Note: Fife, Kinross, Perth and Clackmannan Roads Act 1810 (50 Geo. 3. c. lxxii)) for making and repairing certain Roads in the Counties of Fife, Kinross, Perth and Clackmannan. (Repealed by Roads from North Queensferry to Perth Act 1829 (10 Geo. 4. c. lxi))
| Road from Foston Bridge to Little Drayton Act 1821 (Note: The titles of two local acts in this session, the Road from Foston Bridge to Little Drayton Act 1821 (1 & 2 Geo. 4. c. xxix) and the Newark-upon-Trent and Bingham Road Act 1821 (1 & 2 Geo. 4. c. xxx), were transposed in the endorsement when the bills received royal assent. The mistake was corrected by a further act, the Foston Bridge and Little Drayton, and Newark-upon-Trent and Bingham Roads Acts Amendment Act 1821 (1 & 2 Geo. 4. c. xcv).) | 1 & 2 Geo. 4. c. xxix | 19 April 1821 |
An Act for continuing the Term, and amending, altering and enlarging the Powers, of an Act of His Majesty's Reign, (Note: Foston Bridge and Little Drayton Road Act 1799 (39 Geo. 3. c. xxvi)) for more effectually repairing the Road from Foston Bridge, in the County of Lincoln, to Little Drayton in the County of Nottingham.
| Newark-upon-Trent and Bingham Road Act 1821 | 1 & 2 Geo. 4. c. xxx | 19 April 1821 |
An Act for more effectually repairing and improving the Road from Newark upon Trent, in the County of Nottingham, to join the Road from Nottingham to Grantham, in the County of Lincoln, near the Guide Post on the Foss Road, near Bingham, in the said County of Nottingham.
| Skipton and Clitheroe Road Act 1821 | 1 & 2 Geo. 4. c. xxxi | 19 April 1821 |
An Act for repairing and improving the Road from Skipton in the County of York, to Clitheroe in the County of Lancaster.
| Newport to Stonnall Road Act 1821 | 1 & 2 Geo. 4. c. xxxii | 19 April 1821 |
An Act for continuing and amending Three Acts of Their late Majesties King George the Second (Note: Chester to Birmingham Road Act 1759 (33 Geo. 2. c. 51)) and King George the Third, (Note: Chester and Whitchurch Roads Act 1778 (18 Geo. 3. c. 86)) (Note: Newport (Salop.) and Stonnall Road Act 1800 (39 & 40 Geo. 3. c. lxiv)) for repairing the Road from Newport, in the County of Salop, to Welsh Harp, in the Township of Stonnall, in the County of Stafford.
| Tilbury Fort Road Act 1821 (repealed) | 1 & 2 Geo. 4. c. xxxiii | 19 April 1821 |
An Act to continue the Term and alter and enlarge the Powers of an Act (Note: Tilbury Fort Road Act 1808 (48 Geo. 3. c. xcii)) passed for making and maintaining a Road from the Romford and Whitechapel Road, to or near Tilbury Fort, in the County of Essex. (Repealed by Statute Law (Repeals) Act 2008 (c. 12))
| Spalding, James Deeping Stone Bridge and Maxey Outgang Road Act 1821 (repealed) | 1 & 2 Geo. 4. c. xxxiv | 19 April 1821 |
An Act for repairing and maintaining the Roads leading from Spalding High Bridge, through Littleworth, and by Frognall, to James Deeping Stone Bridge, in the County of Lincoln, and thence to Maxey Outgang, in the County of Northampton, adjoining the High Road there. (Repealed by Spalding, James Deeping Stone Bridge and Maxey Outgang Roads Act 1843 (6 & 7 Vict. c. xciv))
| Alfold Bars and Newbridge Road Act 1821 | 1 & 2 Geo. 4. c. xxxv | 19 April 1821 |
An Act for enlarging the Term and Powers of several Acts, passed in the Thirtieth Year of the Reign of His late Majesty King George the Second, (Note: Guildford and Arundel Road Act 1757 (30 Geo. 2. c. 60)) and in the Eighteenth (Note: Guildford and New Bridge Road Act 1799 (18 Geo. 3. c. 110)) and Thirty ninth (Note: Guildford and New Bridge Road Act 1799 (39 Geo. 3. c. xxxiv)) Years of the Reign of His late Majesty King George the Third, so far as the same relate to the Road from Alfold Bars, in the County of Surrey, to Newbridge, in the County of Sussex.
| Road from Macclesfield to the Buxton Turnpike Road Act 1821 (repealed) | 1 & 2 Geo. 4. c. xxxvi | 19 April 1821 |
An Act for more effectually repairing the Road from Brokencross in Macclesfield, in the County of Chester, to the Turnpike Road at Buxton, in the County of Derby, and certain Branches of Road to communicate with the said Macclesfield Road; and for making a new Road from The Waters in Macclesfield to Buxton aforesaid. (Repealed by Macclesfield and Buxton Turnpike Road Act 1852 (15 & 16 Vict. c. lxxxviii))
| Roads to and from Exeter Act 1821 (repealed) | 1 & 2 Geo. 4. c. xxxvii | 19 April 1821 |
An Act for enlarging the Powers of an Act of His late Majesty, (Note: Roads to and from Exeter Act 1815 (55 Geo. 3. c. xii)) for repairing the Roads leading to and from the City of Exeter, and for making a new Branch of Road to communicate therewith. (Repealed by Roads to and from Exeter Act 1826 (7 Geo. 4. c. xxv))
| Athy and Kilkenny, Castlecomer and Leighlin Bridge, and Carlow and Castlecomer Roads Act 1821 | 1 & 2 Geo. 4. c. xxxviii | 19 April 1821 |
An Act for repairing the Road from the Town of Athy, in the County of Kildare, through the Town of Castlecomer, in the County of Kilkenny, to the City of Kilkenny, and from the Town of Castlecomer, to the Town of Leighlin Bridge, in the County of Carlow, and from the Town of Carlow to the said Town of Castlecomer.
| Road from Loughborough to Ashby-de-la-Zouch Act 1821 (repealed) | 1 & 2 Geo. 4. c. xxxix | 19 April 1821 |
An Act to continue the Term, and to alter, amend and enlarge the Powers, of several Acts (Note: Leicester Roads Act 1757 (30 Geo. 2. c. 44)) (Note: Leicester and Notts Roads Act 1762 (2 Geo. 3. c. 82)) (Note: Loughborough, Ashby-de-la-Zouche and Rempstone Roads Act 1799 (39 Geo. 3. c. xlvii)) passed for repairing the Road leading from Burleigh Bridge in Loughborough, to Ashby de la Zouch, in the County of Leicester; and also the Road branching out of the said Road at Coleorton Church, to Rempstone, in the Counties of Leicester and Nottingham. (Repealed by Loughborough, Ashby-de-la-Zouche and Rempstone Road Act 1863 (26 & 27 Vict. c. liii))
| Rochester and Maidstone Road Act 1821 | 1 & 2 Geo. 4. c. xl | 19 April 1821 |
An Act for continuing the Term, and altering and amending the Powers, of several Acts, (Note: Kent Roads (No. 2) Act 1773 (13 Geo. 3. c. 114)) (Note: Rochester and Maidstone Road Act 1799 (39 Geo. 3. c. lxii)) (Note: Rochester and Maidstone Road Act 1820 (1 Geo. 4. c. lxvi)) for repairing the Road leading from the High Street in the City of Rochester, to Maidstone, in the County of Kent; and for amending and improving the Road branching from the said Road, at the Bridgewood Gates, and running into the Town of Chatham, in the said County of Kent.
| Road from Ticehurst to Hastings Act 1821 (repealed) | 1 & 2 Geo. 4. c. xli | 19 April 1821 |
An Act for more effectually repairing and improving the Road leading from Flimwell Vent, in the Parish of Ticehurst, in the County of Sussex, to the Town and Port of Hastings, in the said County. (Repealed by Flimwell Vent to Hastings Road Act 1849 (12 & 13 Vict. c. lxv))
| Porthleven Harbour Act 1821 | 1 & 2 Geo. 4. c. xlii | 19 April 1821 |
An Act for extending the Term and altering and enlarging the Powers of several Acts passed in the Reign of His late Majesty King George the Third, (Note: Porthleven Harbour Act 1811 (51 Geo. 3. c. cxcv)) (Note: Porthleven Harbour Act 1813 (53 Geo. 3. c. xxxiv)) (Note: Porthleven Harbour Act 1816 (56 Geo. 3. c. xxii)) for constructing an Harbour in Mount's Bay, in the County of Cornwall.
| Regent's Canal Act 1821 (repealed) | 1 & 2 Geo. 4. c. xliii | 19 April 1821 |
An Act to remove Doubts as to the Power of the Commissioners of Exchequer Bills to advance a further Sum of Money to the Regent's Canal Company, and to amend the Acts for making the said Canal. (Repealed by Grand Union Canal Act 1943 (6 & 7 Geo. 6. c. v))
| Stockton and Darlington Railway Act 1821 (repealed) | 1 & 2 Geo. 4. c. xliv | 19 April 1821 |
An Act for making and maintaining a Railway or Tramroad from the River Tees at Stockton, to Witton Park Colliery, with several Branches therefrom, all in the County of Durham. (Repealed by Stockton and Darlington Railway (Consolidation of Acts, Increase of Capital and Purchase of Middlesbrough Dock) Act 1849 (12 & 13 Vict. c. liv))
| Hull Gas Act 1821 | 1 & 2 Geo. 4. c. xlv | 19 April 1821 |
An Act for lighting with Gas the Town of Kingston upon Hull, and certain Places adjacent thereto.
| River Dun Navigation Act 1821 | 1 & 2 Geo. 4. c. xlvi | 7 May 1821 |
An Act for improving the Navigation of the River Dun, and for altering the Course thereof, by making certain New Cuts or Canals from the same, and for amending, altering and enlarging the Powers granted to the River Dun Company, (Note: River Dun Navigation Act 1725 (12 Geo. 1. c. 38)) (Note: River Dun Navigation Act 1726 (13 Geo. 1. c. 20)) (Note: River Dun Navigation Act 1732 (6 Geo. 2. c. 9)) (Note: River Dun Navigation Act 1739 (13 Geo. 2. c. 11)) by several Acts relating to the said Navigation.
| Manchester and Salford Water Act 1821 | 1 & 2 Geo. 4. c. xlvii | 7 May 1821 |
An Act to alter and amend several Acts (Note: Manchester and Salford Water Act 1809 (49 Geo. 3. c. cxcii)) (Note: Manchester and Salford Water Act 1813 (52 Geo. 3. c. xx)) (Note: Manchester and Salford Water Act 1816 (56 Geo. 3. c. xii)) passed for more effectually supplying with Water the Inhabitants of the Towns of Manchester and Salford, in the Parish of Manchester, in the County Palatine of Lancaster; and for further extending the Powers and Provisions of the said Acts.
| Glasgow Improvement Act 1821 | 1 & 2 Geo. 4. c. xlviii | 7 May 1821 |
An Act to continue the Term and amend and enlarge the Powers of Two Acts of His late Majesty, (Note: Glasgow City Extension and Improvement Act 1800 (39 & 40 Geo. 3. c. lxxxviii)) (Note: Glasgow City Extension and Improvement Act 1807 (47 Geo. 3 Sess. 2. c. xxix)) for paving, lighting and cleansing the Streets, and for regulating the Police of the City of Glasgow.
| Lincoln Poor Relief Act 1821 (repealed) | 1 & 2 Geo. 4. c. xlix | 7 May 1821 |
An Act to amend and render more effectual an Act passed in the Thirty sixth Year of the Reign of His late Majesty King George the Third, intituled "An Act for the better Relief and Employment of the Poor of the several Parishes within the City of Lincoln, and County of the same City, and of the Parish of Saint Margaret, Part whereof lies within the said City, and the other Part in the Close of Lincoln, in the County of Lincoln." (Note: Lincoln Poor Relief Act 1796 (36 Geo. 3. c. 102)) (Repealed by Lincoln City Council Act 1985 (c. xxxviii))
| Coventry Gas Act 1821 (repealed) | 1 & 2 Geo. 4. c. l | 7 May 1821 |
An Act for incorporating the City of Coventry Gas Light Company. (Repealed by Coventry Gas Act 1856 (19 & 20 Vict. c. xxxviii))
| South London Gas Act 1821 | 1 & 2 Geo. 4. c. li | 7 May 1821 |
An Act for incorporating the South London Gas Light and Coke Company, situate in the Parish of Saint Saviour, in the County of Surrey.
| Whitechapel Road Gas Light Company Act 1821 | 1 & 2 Geo. 4. c. lii | 7 May 1821 |
An Act for lighting with Gas the Turnpike Road from Whitechapel Church in the County of Middlesex, to certain Dwelling Houses erected and being beyond the Four Mile Stones upon the Ilford and Woodford Roads, in the County of Essex.
| Aberdeen, Banff and Kincardine Roads Act 1821 (repealed) | 1 & 2 Geo. 4. c. liii | 7 May 1821 |
An Act for more effectually making, maintaining and repairing certain Roads in the County of Aberdeen, and in the Counties of Banff and Kincardine. (Repealed by Aberdeen, Banff and Kincardine Roads Act 1842 (5 & 6 Vict. c. xxxviii))
| Gander Lane and Sheffield, and Mosborough Green and Clown Roads Act 1821 | 1 & 2 Geo. 4. c. liv | 7 May 1821 |
An Act for continuing and amending Two Acts of His late Majesty, (Note: Derby and Yorks Roads Act 1779 (19 Geo. 3. c. 99)) (Note: Gander Lane and Sheffield, and Mosborough Green and Clown Roads Act 1799 (39 Geo. 3. c. xxxv)) for repairing the Roads from Gander Lane, in the County of Derby, to Sheffield, in the County of York, and from Mosbrough Green to Clown, both in the said County of Derby; and also for widening and altering certain Parts of the said Roads, and making and maintaining certain Branches of Road communicating therewith.
| Lambeth Inclosure Act 1821 | 1 & 2 Geo. 4. c. lv | 7 May 1821 |
An Act to repeal certain Parts of, and to alter and amend an Act passed in the Forty sixth Year of the Reign of His late Majesty King George the Third, (Note: Rush Common (Lambeth and Wandsworth) Act 1806 (46 Geo. 3. c. lvii)) for inclosing Lands in the Manor of Lambeth, in the County of Surrey.
| Sheet Bridge and Portsmouth, and Petersfield and Ropley Roads Act 1821 | 1 & 2 Geo. 4. c. lvi | 28 May 1821 |
An Act to continue the Term, and alter and enlarge the Powers, of Two Acts, (Note: Southampton Roads Act 1772 (12 Geo. 3. c. 108)) (Note: Southampton Portsmouth and Sheet Bridge Roads Act 1796 (36 Geo. 3. c. 135)) for repairing the Roads from Sheet Bridge to Portsmouth, and from Petersfield to the Alton Turnpike Road, near Ropley, in the County of Southampton.
| Newport (Isle of Wight) Gas Act 1821 | 1 & 2 Geo. 4. c. lvii | 28 May 1821 |
An Act for lighting with Gas the Town of Newport, in the Isle of Wight, and Places adjacent.
| Shrewsbury Improvement Act 1821 (repealed) | 1 & 2 Geo. 4. c. lviii | 28 May 1821 |
An Act for repealing an Act passed in the Twenty ninth Year of the Reign of His Majesty King George the Second, (Note: Shrewsbury Improvement Act 1756 (29 Geo. 2. c. 78)) for paving, lighting and watching the Town of Shrewsbury, in the County of Salop; and for granting other Powers in lieu thereof. (Repealed by Shrewsbury Improvement Act 1855 (18 & 19 Vict. c. clxxviii))
| Worthing Improvement Act 1821 | 1 & 2 Geo. 4. c. lix | 28 May 1821 |
An Act to repeal Two Acts made in the Forty third (Note: Worthing Improvement Act 1803 (43 Geo. 3. c. lix)) and Forty ninth (Note: Worthing Improvement Act 1809 (49 Geo. 3. c. cxiv)) Years of His late Majesty, for paving the Town of Worthing, in the County of Sussex, and establishing a Market therein, and for making other Provisions in lieu thereof; for erecting Groyns, for laying a Duty on Coals imported into the said Town, and for other Purposes relating to the Improvement of the said Town.
| Airdrie Improvement Act 1821 (repealed) | 1 & 2 Geo. 4. c. lx | 28 May 1821 |
An Act for erecting the Town of Airdrie, in the County of Lanark, into a Burgh of Barony, paving, lighting and improving the same, and establishing a Police therein. (Repealed by Airdrie Corporation Order Confirmation Act 1951 (14 & 15 Geo. 6. c. xiii))
| Stratford-upon-Avon Canal Act 1821 | 1 & 2 Geo. 4. c. lxi | 28 May 1821 |
An Act to enable the Company of Proprietors of the Stratford upon Avon Canal Navigation, to subscribe a further Sum of Money for the Purposes of the said Navigation.
| River Arun Navigation and Portsmouth and Arundel Navigation Act 1821 | 1 & 2 Geo. 4. c. lxii | 28 May 1821 |
An Act for giving further Powers to the Company of Proprietors of the River Arun Navigation, and for confirming certain Agreements entered into between the said Company, and the Company of Proprietors of the Portsmouth and Arundel Navigation.
| Stratford and Moreton Railway Act 1821 | 1 & 2 Geo. 4. c. lxiii | 28 May 1821 |
An Act for making and maintaining a Railway or Tramroad from Stratford upon Avon in the County of Warwick to Moreton in Marsh in the County of Gloucester, with a Branch to Shipston upon Stour in the County of Worcester.
| Eau Brink Act 1821 or the Bedford Level Drainage and Ouse Navigation Act 1821 | 1 & 2 Geo. 4. c. lxiv | 28 May 1821 |
An Act for altering and enlarging the Powers of several Acts of His late Majesty King George the Third, (Note: Eau Brink Act 1795 (35 Geo. 3. c. 77)) (Note: Eau Brink Act 1796 (36 Geo. 3. c. 33)) (Note: Eau Brink Act 1805 (45 Geo. 3. c. lxxii)) (Note: Eau Brink Act 1816 (56 Geo. 3. c. xxxviii)) (Note: Eau Brink Act 1818 (58 Geo. 3. c. xlviii)) (Note: Eau Brink Act 1819 (59 Geo. 3. c. lxxix)) for improving the Drainage of the Middle and South Levels, Part of the Great Level of the Fens called Bedford Level, and other Lands therein mentioned, and for improving the Navigation of the River Ouze, in the County of Norfolk, and of the several Rivers communicating therewith.
| Brecon Bridges Act 1821 | 1 & 2 Geo. 4. c. lxv | 28 May 1821 |
An Act to enable the Justices of the Peace for the County of Brecon to rebuild repair and take down Bridges within the said County not being County Bridges.
| Belfast Commercial Buildings Act 1821 | 1 & 2 Geo. 4. c. lxvi | 28 May 1821 |
An Act for enabling the Proprietors of the Commercial Buildings, in the Town of Belfast, to sue and be sued in the Name of their Secretary, and for the Regulation of the said Buildings, and the Property thereof.
| St. Luke Chelsea Rates Act 1821 (repealed) | 1 & 2 Geo. 4. c. lxvii | 28 May 1821 |
An Act for better assessing and collecting the Poors Rates, and relieving the Poor of the Parish of Saint Luke, Chelsea, in the County of Middlesex, and for other Purposes relating thereto; and for authorizing the Sale of the Dust and Ashes to arise within such Parts of the said Parish as are not included in the Hans Town District; for the Application of the Money to arise by such Sale; and for better collecting the Composition for the Repairs of the Highways of the said Parish. (Repealed by St. Luke Chelsea Poor Laws and Highways Act 1841 (4 & 5 Vict. c. xvii))
| Chichester Improvement Act 1821 | 1 & 2 Geo. 4. c. lxviii | 28 May 1821 |
An Act for better lighting and for watching the City of Chichester, and Places adjacent.
| Brentford Gas Act 1821 | 1 & 2 Geo. 4. c. lxix | 28 May 1821 |
An Act for supplying the Towns of Old and New Brentford, and the Villages of Turnham Green, Hammersmith and Kensington, in the County of Middlesex, with Gas.
| Nottingham Gas Act 1821 (repealed) | 1 & 2 Geo. 4. c. lxx | 28 May 1821 |
An Act to alter amend and enlarge the Powers of an Act of the Second Year of His late Majesty's Reign, intituled "An Act for the enlightening the Streets, Lanes and Passages within the Town and County of the Town of Nottingham." (Note: Nottingham (Lighting, etc.) Act 1762 (2 Geo. 3. c. 47)) (Repealed by Nottingham Street Lighting Act 1843 (6 & 7 Vict. c. ii))
| Dudley Gas Act 1821 (repealed) | 1 & 2 Geo. 4. c. lxxi | 28 May 1821 |
An Act for incorporating the Town of Dudley Gas Light Company. (Repealed by Dudley Gas Act 1853 (16 & 17 Vict. c. ii))
| Stepney Gas and Improvement Act 1821 (repealed) | 1 & 2 Geo. 4. c. lxxii | 28 May 1821 |
An Act to light and otherwise improve the Streets and other Public Passages and Places within the Hamlet of Mile End Old Town, in the Parish of Saint Dunstan, Stepney, otherwise Stebonheath, in the County of Middlesex. (Repealed by London Government (Borough of Stepney) Order in Council 1901 (SR&O 1901/276))
| Portsea Gas Act 1821 | 1 & 2 Geo. 4. c. lxxiii | 28 May 1821 |
An Act for incorporating the Town of Portsea Gas Light Company.
| Poplar Gas Act 1821 | 1 & 2 Geo. 4. c. lxxiv | 28 May 1821 |
An Act for supplying the Parish of All Saints, Poplar, in the County of Middlesex, with Gas
| Barnsley Gas Act 1821 (repealed) | 1 & 2 Geo. 4. c. lxxv | 28 May 1821 |
An Act for lighting the Town of Barnsley, in the West Riding of the County of York, with Gas. (Repealed by Barnsley Gas Act 1852 (15 & 16 Vict. c. viii))
| Ipswich Gas Act 1821 | 1 & 2 Geo. 4. c. lxxvi | 28 May 1821 |
An Act for lighting with Gas the Town and Borough of Ipswich, in the County of Suffolk.
| London Institution Act 1821 | 1 & 2 Geo. 4. c. lxxvii | 28 May 1821 |
An Act for providing an Increase of the Annual Income of the London Institution.
| Bolton and Westhoughton Chapel Road Act 1821 (repealed) | 1 & 2 Geo. 4. c. lxxviii | 28 May 1821 |
An Act for continuing the Term and altering and enlarging the Powers of an Act of His late Majesty's Reign, (Note: Great Bolton and Westhoughton Chapel Road Act 1800 (39 & 40 Geo. 3. c. lxxiv)) for amending the Road leading from the South End of the Moor Lane, in the Township of Great Bolton, into the Turnpike Road from Manchester to Wigan, near Westhoughton Chapel, in the County Palatine of Lancaster. (Repealed by Bolton and Westhoughton Road Act 1842 (5 & 6 Vict. c. lxxiii))
| Keyberry Bridge, Shaldon and Torquay Roads Act 1821 (repealed) | 1 & 2 Geo. 4. c. lxxix | 28 May 1821 |
An Act to enlarge the Term and Powers of several Acts of His late Majesty, (Note: Devon Roads Act 1787 (5 Geo. 3. c. 70)) (Note: Devon Roads Act 1787 (27 Geo. 3. c. 74)) (Note: Keyberry Bridge, Shalldon and Torquay Roads Act 1808 (48 Geo. 3. c. lxvi)) for repairing the Roads from Keyberry Bridge to Shalldon, and from the said Bridge to Torquay, in the County of Devon; and to alter the Line of certain Parts of the said Roads. (Repealed by Newton Abbott and Torquay Roads Act 1823 (4 Geo. 4. c. xvii))
| Moses Gate District of Road (Lancashire) Act 1821 (repealed) | 1 & 2 Geo. 4. c. lxxx | 28 May 1821 |
An Act for repealing an Act of His late Majesty's Reign, (Note: Lancaster Roads Act 1793 (33 Geo. 3. c. 181)) for improving the Road from Manchester to Bolton, and other Places therein mentioned in the County of Lancaster, so far as relates to the Moses Gate District of Road therein mentioned; and for granting further and more effectual Powers instead thereof; and for repairing and improving the said District of Roads; and making a new Branch of Road to communicate with the said District of Road. (Repealed by Moses Gate District of Road (Lancashire) Act 1833 (3 & 4 Will. 4. c. xxii))
| Birmingham and Stratford-upon-Avon Road Act 1821 | 1 & 2 Geo. 4. c. lxxxi | 28 May 1821 |
An Act for repairing the Road from Birmingham through Stratford upon Avon to Stratford Bridge in the County of Warwick.
| Gloucester to Bristol Road and Branches Act 1821 (repealed) | 1 & 2 Geo. 4. c. lxxxii | 28 May 1821 |
An Act for repairing Part of the Great Road from Gloucester to Bristol, and certain Roads through and near the Towns of Berkeley, Dursley, Wotton under Edge and Stroud, and other Roads therein mentioned, in the Counties of Gloucester and Wilts. (Repealed by Statute Law (Repeals) Act 2013 (c. 2))
| Roads from Tetbury, Frocester Hill and from Latterwood Act 1821 (repealed) | 1 & 2 Geo. 4. c. lxxxiii | 28 May 1821 |
An Act for repairing the Roads from Tetbury to Symondshall, from Frocester Hill to Dunkirk, and from the Latterwood to Nailsworth, and other Roads therein mentioned, all in the County of Gloucester. (Repealed by Statute Law (Repeals) Act 2013 (c. 2))
| Alemouth and Hexham Road and Branch Act 1821 | 1 & 2 Geo. 4. c. lxxxiv | 28 May 1821 |
An Act for repairing the Road from Alemouth through Alnwick and Rothbury to Hexham, and a Branch from the said Road between Alnwick and Rothbury to Jockey's Dike Bridge, all in the County of Northumberland.
| Hockliffe, Woburn and Newport Pagnell Roads Act 1821 | 1 & 2 Geo. 4. c. lxxxv | 28 May 1821 |
An Act for amending and more effectually repairing the Highway between Hockliffe and Woburn, in the County of Bedford; and for repairing the Road leading through Woburn to Tickford Bridge, in Newport Pagnell, in the County of Buckingham.
| Weston-on-the-Green and Kidlington Road Act 1821 (repealed) | 1 & 2 Geo. 4. c. lxxxvi | 28 May 1821 |
An Act to continue and amend Two Acts, (Note: Oxford Roads Act 1781 (21 Geo. 3. c. 87)) (Note: Kidlington Green Road Act 1801 (41 Geo. 3. (U.K.) c. cxxxvii)) for repairing the Road from the Turnpike Road near the Town of Weston on the Green, in the County of Oxford, to the Turnpike Road on Kidlington Green, in the said County. (Repealed by Statute Law (Repeals) Act 2013 (c. 2))
| Road from Parkhouse to the Three Mile House (Lanarkshire) Act 1821 (repealed) | 1 & 2 Geo. 4. c. lxxxvii | 28 May 1821 |
An Act for enlarging, explaining and continuing certain Acts of His late Majesty's Reign, (Note: Glasgow and Renfrew Roads Act 1794 (34 Geo. 3. c. 140)) (Note: Parkhouse (Lanarkshire) Roads Act 1800 (39 & 40 Geo. 3. c. xciv)) for repairing and keeping in Repair the Road from Parkhouse to or near the Three Mile House, in the County of Lanark. (Repealed by Glasgow and Lanark Road Act 1843 (6 & 7 Vict. c. xxxix))
| Stourbridge Roads Act 1821 (repealed) | 1 & 2 Geo. 4. c. lxxxviii | 28 May 1821 |
An Act for amending and keeping in Repair the several Roads leading to and from the late Market House in Stourbridge, in the County of Worcester, and also several other Roads leading from and connected with the said Roads in the Counties of Worcester and Stafford. (Repealed by Stourbridge Roads Act 1842 (5 & 6 Vict. c. xcv))
| Bewdley Roads Act 1821 | 1 & 2 Geo. 4. c. lxxxix | 28 May 1821 |
An Act to continue the Term and alter and enlarge the Powers of Three Acts, (Note: Bewdley Roads Act 1753 (26 Geo. 2. c. 39)) (Note: Bewdley Roads Act 1774 (14 Geo. 3. c. 112)) (Note: Bewdley Roads Act 1800 (39 & 40 Geo. 3. c. lxxi)) for repairing and widening several Roads leading from the Town of Bewdley, in the County of Worcester, to the several Places therein mentioned, in the Counties of Worcester and Salop respectively.
| Road from Bury to Little Bolton Act 1821 (repealed) | 1 & 2 Geo. 4. c. xc | 28 May 1821 |
An Act for making a Road from Bury, in the County Palatine of Lancaster, to or near a certain House, known by the Sign of The Bull and Wharf, in the Township of Little Bolton, in the said County. (Repealed by Road from Bury to Little Bolton Act 1828 (9 Geo. 4. c. xi))
| Kidderminster Roads Act 1821 | 1 & 2 Geo. 4. c. xci | 28 May 1821 |
An Act for more effectually repairing several Roads leading from Kidderminster, in the County of Worcester, and several other Roads connected therewith, in the Counties of Worcester, Stafford and Salop.
| Roads from Bromyard (Herefordshire and Worcestershire) Act 1821 (repealed) | 1 & 2 Geo. 4. c. xcii | 28 May 1821 |
An Act for repairing and maintaining several Roads leading from the Town of Bromyard, in the County of Hereford, and other Roads adjoining thereto, in the said County, and in the County of Worcester. (Repealed by Bromyard Roads (Herefordshire and Worcestershire) Act 1842 (5 & 6 Vict. c. xciv))
| Elsdon and Red Swyre Road Act 1821 | 1 & 2 Geo. 4. c. xciii | 28 May 1821 |
An Act to continue the Term and alter and amend the Powers of Two Acts, (Note: Northumberland Roads Act 1776 (16 Geo. 3. c. 83)) (Note: Elsdon and Red Swyre Road Act 1800 (39 & 40 Geo. 3. c. lxii)) for repairing the Road from Elsdon High Cross, near the Town of Elsdon, in the County of Northumberland, to the Red Swyre, upon the Mid Border betwixt England and Scotland.
| Road from Leeds to Otley Act 1821 (repealed) | 1 & 2 Geo. 4. c. xciv | 28 May 1821 |
An Act for amending the Road from Leeds to Otley, in the West Riding of the County of York. (Repealed by Road from Leeds to Otley Act 1837 (7 Will. 4 & 1 Vict. c. xxxvi))
| Foston Bridge and Little Drayton, and Newark-upon-Trent and Bingham Roads Acts Amendment Act 1821 | 1 & 2 Geo. 4. c. xcv | 28 May 1821 |
An Act to rectify Mistakes in the Titles of Two Acts (Note: Road from Foston Bridge to Little Drayton Act 1821 (1 & 2 Geo. 4. c. xxix)) (Note: Newark-upon-Trent and Bingham Road Act 1821 (1 & 2 Geo. 4. c. xxx)) passed in the present Session of Parliament, the one for continuing the Term of an Act of His late Majesty’s Reign, for repairing the Road from Foston Bridge, in the County of Lincoln, to Little Drayton, in the County of Nottingham; and the other for repairing the Road from Newark-upon-Trent, in the said County of Nottingham, to join the Road in the said Act mentioned near Bingham, in the said County of Nottingham.
| Salop. County Judges' Accommodations Act 1821 (repealed) | 1 & 2 Geo. 4. c. xcvi | 8 June 1821 |
An Act for providing a convenient House, with suitable Accommodations for His Majesty's Judges at the Assizes for the County of Salop, and for maintaining and supporting the same. (Repealed by Statute Law (Repeals) Act 2013 (c. 2))
| Wilts and Berks Canal Navigation Act 1821 | 1 & 2 Geo. 4. c. xcvii | 8 June 1821 |
An Act for incorporating the Company of Proprietors of the North Wilts Canal Navigation with the Company of Proprietors of the Wilts and Berks Canal Navigation; and for repealing the several Acts passed for making and maintaining the said Canals, and for consolidating the Powers and Provisions thereof in One Act.
| Saltcoats Harbour Act 1821 (repealed) | 1 & 2 Geo. 4. c. xcviii | 8 June 1821 |
An Act for more effectually enlarging, deepening, improving and maintaining the Harbour of Saltcoats, in the County of Ayr. (Repealed by Saltcoats Harbour Improvements Act 1843 (6 & 7 Vict. c. xlv))
| Lyme Regis Harbour Act 1821 (repealed) | 1 & 2 Geo. 4. c. xcix | 8 June 1821 |
An Act for improving and maintaining the Harbour Pier or Cobb, at the Port and Borough of Lyme Regis, in the County of Dorset. (Repealed by Lyme Regis, Bridport (West Bay) and Weymouth Harbour Revision Order 2026 (SI 2026/62))
| Edinburgh Gaol and Approaches Act 1821 | 1 & 2 Geo. 4. c. c | 8 June 1821 |
An Act to alter and amend Three Acts of the Fifty third, (Note: Edinburgh Gaol Act 1813 (53 Geo. 3. c. lxxvii)) Fifty fourth, (Note: Edinburgh Gaol, Offices, Low Calton Bridge and Improvements Act 1814 (54 Geo. 3. c. clxx)) and Fifty sixth (Note: Edinburgh Gaol Act 1816 (56 Geo. 3. c. xlii)) Years of His late Majesty, for enabling Commissioners to erect and maintain a new Gaol and other Buildings for the County and City of Edinburgh, and for opening Communications with the same; and to enable the Trustees for Turnpike and other High Roads in the said County of Edinburgh to advance further Sums of Money to the said Commissioners.
| Shrewsbury and Church Stretton Roads Act 1821 (repealed) | 1 & 2 Geo. 4. c. ci | 8 June 1821 |
An Act to continue the Term, and alter and enlarge the Powers of several Acts (Note: Shropshire Roads Act 1756 (29 Geo. 2. c. 61)) (Note: Shrewsbury Roads Act 1772 (12 Geo. 3. c. 77)) (Note: Salop, Radnor and Montgomery Roads Act 1785 (25 Geo. 3. c. 118)) (Note: Roads from Shrewsbury, Pulley Common, Coleham Bridge and Longden Act 1799 (39 Geo. 3. c. xxix)) passed for repairing the Road from Coleham Bridge, in Shrewsbury, to the Market Place in Church Stretton, and several other Roads therein described, all in the County of Salop. (Repealed by Church Stretton and Longden Roads (Salop.) Act 1842 (5 & 6 Vict. c. lxxii))
| Essex Gaols Act 1821 (repealed) | 1 & 2 Geo. 4. c. cii | 8 June 1821 |
An Act for building an additional Gaol for the county of Essex, and for enlarging, improving and altering the existing Prisons for the same County. (Repealed by Statute Law (Repeals) Act 2008 (c. 12))
| Parishes of Tarleton and Hesketh with Becconsall Act 1821 | 1 & 2 Geo. 4. c. ciii | 8 June 1821 |
An Act for making the Townships and Hamlets of Tarleton, and of Hesketh with Becconsall, in the Parish of Croston, and Part of the Rectory and Vicarage thereof, in the County of Lancaster, separate and distinct Parishes.
| Ipswich Improvement Act 1821 | 1 & 2 Geo. 4. c. civ | 8 June 1821 |
An Act to alter and amend several Acts of His late Majesty's Reign, (Note: Ipswich Improvement Act 1793 (33 Geo. 3. c. 92)) (Note: Ipswich Improvement Act 1797 (37 Geo. 3. c. 44)) (Note: Ipswich Improvement Act 1815 (55 Geo. 3. c. xxvi)) for paving, lighting, and otherwise improving the Town of Ipswich, in the County of Suffolk.
| Cley-next-the-Sea Inclosure and Wiveton Drainage Act 1821 | 1 & 2 Geo. 4. c. cv | 8 June 1821 |
An Act for enclosing Lands in the Parish of Cley next the Sea, in the County of Norfolk; and for embanking and draining Parts of the said Lands, and Lands in the Parish of Wiveton, in the said County.
| Newry and Bannbridge Road Act 1821 (repealed) | 1 & 2 Geo. 4. c. cvi | 8 June 1821 |
An Act to continue and amend an Act of His late Majesty, (Note: Dundalk to Bannbridge Road Act 1783 (23 & 24 Geo. 3. c. 27 (I))) for repairing the Road from Dundalk, in the County of Louth, to Bannbridge, in the County of Down, so far as relates to the Northern Division of the said Road. (Repealed by Dundalk and Bannbridge Road (Northern Division) Act 1843 (6 & 7 Vict. c. xlviii))
| Dunstable and Pondyards Road Act 1821 (repealed) | 1 & 2 Geo. 4. c. cvii | 8 June 1821 |
An Act for more effectually repairing the Road from Dunstable, in the County of Bedford, to the Pond Yards in the County of Hertford. (Repealed by Statute Law (Repeals) Act 2013 (c. 2))
| Lyme Regis Roads Act 1821 (repealed) | 1 & 2 Geo. 4. c. cviii | 8 June 1821 |
An Act for repairing, widening and maintaining several Roads in the Counties of Dorset and Devon, leading to and through the Borough of Lyme Regis, and from the Turnpike Road on Uplyme Hill, to the Turnpike Road at the Three Ashes, in the Parish of Crewkerne, in the County of Somerset. (Repealed by Lyme Regis Turnpike Road Act 1855 (18 & 19 Vict. c. lxxxvii))
| Crickley Hill and Campsfield Roads Act 1821 (repealed) | 1 & 2 Geo. 4. c. cix | 8 June 1821 |
An Act to continue the Term and alter and enlarge the Powers of Three Acts, (Note: Gloucester and Oxford Road Act 1750 (24 Geo. 2. c. 28)) (Note: Gloucester and Oxford Roads Act 1768 (8 Geo. 3. c. 41)) (Note: Crickley Hill, Campsfield and Kidlington Roads Act 1798 (38 Geo. 3. c. xiii)) so far as relates to the Roads from the Top of Crickley Hill, in the County of Gloucester, to and through Northleach, Burford and Witney, to Campsfield, and the Turnpike Road at or near Enslow Bridge, in the County of Oxford. (Repealed by Annual Turnpike Acts Continuance Act 1869 (32 & 33 Vict. c. 90) and Statute Law (Repeals) Act 2013 (c. 2))
| Roads to Highgate House and Hampstead Act 1821 (repealed) | 1 & 2 Geo. 4. c. cx | 8 June 1821 |
An Act for more effectually repairing the Roads leading to Highgate Gate House and Hampstead, and other Roads therein mentioned, all in the County of Middlesex; and for watching, lighting and otherwise improving the said Roads. (Repealed by Metropolis Roads Act 1826 (7 Geo. 4. c. cxlii))
| Todmorden and Burnley, Littleborough, and Halifax Roads Act 1821 | 1 & 2 Geo. 4. c. cxi | 8 June 1821 |
An Act for repairing and maintaining the Roads from Todmorden to Fulledge Lane End in Burnley, and to Littleborough, in the County of Lancaster, and to Kingcross, in the Parish of Halifax, in the County of York.
| Road from Shoreditch Church through Hackney Act 1821 (repealed) | 1 & 2 Geo. 4. c. cxii | 8 June 1821 |
An Act for repairing and maintaining the Road from Shoreditch Church through Hackney to Stamford Hill, in the County of Middlesex, and other Roads communicating therewith in the same County. (Repealed by Metropolis Roads Act 1826 (7 Geo. 4. c. cxlii))
| Marlborough and Everley Road and Branch Act 1821 | 1 & 2 Geo. 4. c. cxiii | 8 June 1821 |
An Act to enlarge the Term and Powers of several Acts of His late Majesty, (Note: Wilts Roads Act 1762 (2 Geo. 3. c. 49)) (Note: Wiltshire Roads (No. 2) Act 1783 (24 Geo. 3. Sess. 1. c. 30)) (Note: Road from the Swindon Turnpike to Everley Act 1805 (45 Geo. 3. c. xxxvii)) for amending the Road from Swindon to Marlborough, and from Marlborough to the Village of Everley, in the County of Wilts, so far as relates to the Marlborough District of the said Road; and also to make a Branch from the said Road to join the present Turnpike Road leading from Andover to Devizes, in the said County.
| St. Nicholas in Harwich Parish Church Act 1821 | 1 & 2 Geo. 4. c. cxiv | 15 June 1821 |
An Act for the Completion of the rebuilding of the Church or Chapel of the Parish of Saint Nicholas in Harwich, in the County of Essex.
| Portmadoc Harbour Act 1821 | 1 & 2 Geo. 4. c. cxv | 15 June 1821 |
An Act to alter and amend an Act of His late Majesty's Reign, intituled "An Act to enable His Majesty to vest the Sands of Traeth Mawr, dividing the Counties of Carnarvon and Merioneth, in William Alexander Madocks Esquire," (Note: Madocks' Estate Act 1807 (47 Geo. 3 Sess. 2. c. xxxvi)) and for building Quays and other Works for the Purpose of facilitating the landing loading and unloading of Ships and Vessels frequenting the Harbour of Port Madoc in the said County of Carnarvon.
| West Riding Cloth Trade Regulations Act 1821 | 1 & 2 Geo. 4. c. cxvi | 23 June 1821 |
An Act for repealing the Laws relating to the Stamping, Straining and Searching of Woollen Cloth, within the West Riding of the County of York, and for substituting other Regulations of the Trade within the said Riding.
| Imperial Gas Light and Coke Company Act 1821 (repealed) | 1 & 2 Geo. 4. c. cxvii | 23 June 1821 |
An Act to establish an additional Company for lighting certain Parts of the Metropolis, and Parts adjacent with Gas. (Repealed by Imperial Gas Act 1854 (17 & 18 Vict. c. lv))
| Firth of Forth Ferries Act 1821 | 1 & 2 Geo. 4. c. cxviii | 23 June 1821 |
An Act to amend and enlarge the Powers of an Act of the Fifty third Year of His late Majesty, (Note: Firth of Forth Bridges Act 1813 (53 Geo. 3. c. cxxv)) for improving the Communication between the County of Edinburgh and County of Fife, by the Ferries cross the Frith of Forth, between Leith and Newhaven, and Kinghorn and Burntisland.
| Montgomeryshire Canal Act 1821 | 1 & 2 Geo. 4. c. cxix | 23 June 1821 |
An Act to enable the Company of Proprietors of the Eastern Branch of the Montgomeryshire Canal, to alter the Line of the Tannat Feeder, to make a Navigable Cut from the Guilsfield Branch to the same; and to amend Two several Acts (Note: Montgomeryshire Canal Act 1794 (34 Geo. 3. c. 39)) (Note: Montgomeryshire Canal Act 1815 (55 Geo. 3. c. lxxxiii)) respecting the said Canal.
| Cramond Bridge Act 1821 | 1 & 2 Geo. 4. c. cxx | 23 June 1821 |
An Act for erecting a Bridge over the River Almond, which divides the Counties of Edinburgh and Linlithgow.
| Cheltenham Improvement Act 1821 (repealed) | 1 & 2 Geo. 4. c. cxxi | 23 June 1821 |
An Act for better paving, lighting, cleansing, watching and improving the Town of Cheltenham, in the County of Gloucester; and for regulating the Police thereof; and for removing and preventing Nuisances and Annoyances therein. (Repealed by Cheltenham Improvement Act 1852 (15 & 16 Vict. c. l))
| Edinburgh and Glasgow Union Canal Act 1821 | 1 & 2 Geo. 4. c. cxxii | 23 June 1821 |
An Act for amending certain Acts (Note: Edinburgh and Glasgow Union Canal Company Act 1817 (57 Geo. 3. c. lvi)) (Note: Edinburgh and Glasgow Union Canal Act 1819 (59 Geo. 3. c. xxix)) for making and maintaining Navigable Canal from the Lothian Road, near the City of Edinburgh, to join the Forth and Clyde Navigation near Falkirk, in the County of Stirling; and giving Power to borrow a further Sum of Money on the Credit of the Tolls granted by the said Acts.
| Thames Lastage and Ballastage Act 1821 | 1 & 2 Geo. 4. c. cxxiii | 2 July 1821 |
An Act for further continuing several Acts (Note: Thames Lastage and Ballastage Act 1805 (45 Geo. 3. c. xcviii)) (Note: Thames Lastage and Ballastage Act 1809 (49 Geo. 3. c. clv)) for the better Regulation of Lastage and Ballastage in the River Thames.
| Louth County Court House Act 1821 (repealed) | 1 & 2 Geo. 4. c. cxxiv | 2 July 1821 |
An Act for enabling the Grand Jury of the County of Louth to levy by Presentment certain Sums of Money expended for the building of the Court House of the said County. (Repealed by Statute Law (Repeals) Act 2013 (c. 2))
| Plymouth and Dartmoor Railway Act 1821 (repealed) | 1 & 2 Geo. 4. c. cxxv | 2 July 1821 |
An Act to authorize the Plymouth and Dartmoor Railway Company to vary the Line of a certain Part of the said Railway; and to amend the Acts (Note: Plymouth and Dartmoor Railway Act 1819 (59 Geo. 3. c. cxv)) (Note: Plymouth and Dartmoor Railway (Crabtree and Sutton Pool Branch) Act 1820 (1 Geo. 4. c. liv)) passed for making the said Railway. (Repealed by Plymouth and Dartmoor Railway Act 1865 (28 & 29 Vict. c. cxxxi))
| Market Street and Blackfriars Bridge, Manchester Act 1821 | 1 & 2 Geo. 4. c. cxxvi | 2 July 1821 |
An Act to improve Market Street, in the Town of Manchester, in the County Palatine of Lancaster, and the Approaches thereto, and to amend an Act passed in the Fifty seventh Year of His late Majesty (Note: Blackfriars Bridge (Manchester) Act 1817 (57 Geo. 3. c. lviii)) for building a Bridge across the River Irwell from Water Street, in the Township of Salford, to Saint Mary's Gate, in the Township of Manchester.
| Glasgow and Carlisle Road Act 1821 | 1 & 2 Geo. 4. c. cxxvii | 2 July 1821 |
An Act for enlarging explaining and amending the Powers granted by certain Acts (Note: Glasgow and Carlisle Road Improvement Act 1816 (56 Geo. 3. c. lxxxiii)) (Note: Glasgow and Carlisle Road Act 1818 (58 Geo. 3. c. 44)) (Note: Glasgow and Carlisle Road Act 1819 (59 Geo. 3. c. xc)) passed for improving the Road from the City of Glasgow to the City of Carlisle.
| Basingstoke and Lobcomb Corner Road Amendment Act 1821 | 1 & 2 Geo. 4. c. cxxviii | 10 July 1821 |
An Act to rectify a Mistake in an Act of this Session of Parliament, (Note: Basingstoke and Lobcombe Corner Road Act 1821 (1 & 2 Geo. 4. c. xxv)) for repairing the Road from Basingstoke, through Wortin and other Places in the County of Southampton, to Lobcomb Corner, in the County of Wilts, and other Roads in the County of Southampton.

=== Private acts ===
| Short title | Citation | Royal assent |
Long title
| Ivinghoe Inclosure Act 1821 | 1 & 2 Geo. 4. c. 1 Pr. | 24 March 1821 |
An Act for inclosing Lands within the Parish of Ivinghoe in the County of Buckingham.
| Moreton Valence Inclosure Act 1821 | 1 & 2 Geo. 4. c. 2 Pr. | 6 April 1821 |
An Act to extend amend and enlarge the Powers of an Act of the Fifty eighth Year of His late Majesty, (Note: Moreton Valence Inclosure Act 1818 (58 Geo. 3. c. 15 Pr.)) for inclosing Lands in the Parish of Moreton Valence, and in the Hamlet or Tything of Putloe in the Parish of Standish, both in the County of Gloucester.
| Great Durnford Inclosure Act 1821 | 1 & 2 Geo. 4. c. 3 Pr. | 6 April 1821 |
An Act for dividing and allotting Lands within the Parish of Great Durnford, in the County of Wilts.
| Higham Inclosure Act 1821 | 1 & 2 Geo. 4. c. 4 Pr. | 6 April 1821 |
An Act for dividing Lands in the Hamlet of Higham, in the County of Suffolk.
| Bishop of Winchester's Estate Act 1821 | 1 & 2 Geo. 4. c. 5 Pr. | 6 April 1821 |
An Act to enable the Lord Bishop of Winchester to sell Winchester House in the Parish of Saint Luke, Chelsea, in the County of Middlesex, and for applying the Money to arise by such Sale in the Purchase of another Residence for the Bishops of Winchester, and for the several other Purposes therein mentioned.
| Taynton Inclosure Act 1821 | 1 & 2 Geo. 4. c. 6 Pr. | 6 April 1821 |
An Act for inclosing Lands in the Parish of Taynton, in the County of Oxford.
| Londesborough Inclosure Act 1821 | 1 & 2 Geo. 4. c. 7 Pr. | 6 April 1821 |
An Act to alter and amend an Act passed in the Fifty sixth Year of the Reign of His late Majesty King George the Third, intituled "An Act for inclosing Lands in the Manor and Parish of Londesborough, in the East Riding of the County of York." (Note: Londesborough Inclosure Act 1816 (56 Geo. 3. c. 22 Pr.))
| Walesby Inclosure Act 1821 | 1 & 2 Geo. 4. c. 8 Pr. | 6 April 1821 |
An Act for inclosing Lands in the several Parishes of Walesby, Kirton and Egmanton, in the County of Nottingham, and for exonerating the same, and also the old inclosed Lands and Grounds within the said several Parishes, from the Payment of Tithes.
| Duke of Northumberland's Estate Act 1821 | 1 & 2 Geo. 4. c. 9 Pr. | 19 April 1821 |
An Act for carrying into effect a Contract entered into for the Sale of certain Copyhold Hereditaments, in the Townships of Backworth, Earsdon, Monkseaton, and Preston, within the Manor of Tynemouth, in the County of Northumberland, the Estate of Ralph William Grey Esquire, to The Most Noble Hugh Duke of Northumberland, and for applying the Money thence arising in the Purchase of other Estates, to be settled to the same Uses as the Estates sold.
| Kirkby Ireleth, &c. Inclosure Act 1821 | 1 & 2 Geo. 4. c. 10 Pr. | 19 April 1821 |
An Act for inclosing Lands in the Townships or Divisions of Kirkby Ireleth and of Lindale and Marton, in the Parish of Dalton, in the County Palatine of Lancaster.
| Burnham Inclosure Act 1821 | 1 & 2 Geo. 4. c. 11 Pr. | 19 April 1821 |
An Act for embanking draining inclosing and improving certain Salt Marshes and Waste Lands within the Parishes of Burnham Norton, Burnham Deepdale and Burnham Overy, in the County of Norfolk.
| Alsager Inclosure Act 1821 | 1 & 2 Geo. 4. c. 12 Pr. | 7 May 1821 |
An Act for inclosing the Commons and Waste Lands in the Manor and Township of Alsager, in the Parish of Barthomley, in the County of Chester.
| Worstead Inclosure Act 1821 | 1 & 2 Geo. 4. c. 13 Pr. | 7 May 1821 |
An Act for dividing and allotting Lands in the Parish of Worstead, in the County of Norfolk.
| Maxwell's Estate Act 1821 | 1 & 2 Geo. 4. c. 14 Pr. | 28 May 1821 |
An Act for empowering the Judges of the Court of Session in Scotland, to sell such Parts of the Estates of Munshes and others, situated in the Stewartry of Kirkcudbright and in the County of Dumfries, which were entailed by John Maxwell Esquire, deceased, as shall be sufficient for Payment and Satisfaction of the Debts, Provisions and other Deeds of the Entailer.
| Archbishop of Dublin's Estate Act 1821 | 1 & 2 Geo. 4. c. 15 Pr. | 28 May 1821 |
An Act to enable the Lord Archbishop of Dublin, and his Successors, to demise the Mansion House of Tallaght, with the Offices, Houses, Gardens and Demesne, situate at Tallaght, in the County of Dublin, belonging to the Archbishop of Dublin.
| Bold's Estate Act 1821 | 1 & 2 Geo. 4. c. 16 Pr. | 28 May 1821 |
An Act to enable Mary Patten Bold the younger, and others, Devisees under the Will of Peter Patten Bold Esquire, deceased, to grant Leases of Coal Mines in the Township of Sutton, in the County of Lancaster, and Leases of Waste Lands in the Parish of North Meols, in the said County; and to authorize Trustees to fell Timber on the devised Estates, and lay out the Money arising from the Sale thereof in the Purchase of Lands to be settled to the same Uses to which the same de vised Estates are limited.
| Austen's Estate Act 1821 | 1 & 2 Geo. 4. c. 17 Pr. | 28 May 1821 |
An Act for vesting certain Impropriate Tithes in the County of Surrey, strictly entailed by and under the Directions in the Will of Robert Austen Esquire, in Trustees, to be sold; and for investing the Money arising from such Sale, under the Direction of the Court of Chancery, in the Purchase of Estates, to be settled to the same Uses.
| Kenn Inclosure Act 1821 | 1 & 2 Geo. 4. c. 18 Pr. | 28 May 1821 |
An Act for dividing allotting and inclosing Lands in the Parish and Manor of Kenn, in the County of Devon Allotment to Rector in lieu of Tithes.
| Stoke D'Abernon Inclosure Act 1821 | 1 & 2 Geo. 4. c. 19 Pr. | 28 May 1821 |
An Act for inclosing Lands within the Manor of Stoke D'Abernon, otherwise Stoke Dawborne, in the Parishes of Stoke D'Abernon, otherwise Stoke Dawborne, and Leatherhead, in the County of Surrey.
| Millbourne Inclosure Act 1821 | 1 & 2 Geo. 4. c. 20 Pr. | 28 May 1821 |
An Act for inclosing Lands within the Manor of Millbourne otherwise Waterville Esher, in the several Parishes of Esher and Cobham, or one of them, in the County of Surrey.
| Tallaght Inclosure Act 1821 | 1 & 2 Geo. 4. c. 21 Pr. | 28 May 1821 |
An Act for inclosing Lands in the Parishes of Tallaght, Killsillaghan alias Killsoughan, and Luske in the County of Dublin.
| Broad Town, &c. Inclosure Act 1821 | 1 & 2 Geo. 4. c. 22 Pr. | 28 May 1821 |
An Act for dividing and allotting Lands in the Manors of Broad Town and Thornhill, in the Parishes of Broad Hinton and Cliffe Pypard, in the County of Wilts.
| Bosham, &c. Inclosure Act 1821 | 1 & 2 Geo. 4. c. 23 Pr. | 28 May 1821 |
An Act for inclosing Lands in the Parishes of Bosham and Funtington, in the County of Sussex.
| Bourton and Moreton Inclosure Act 1821 | 1 & 2 Geo. 4. c. 24 Pr. | 28 May 1821 |
An Act for inclosing and exonerating from Tithes, Lands in the Parish or Parishes of Bourton on the Hill and Moreton in Marsh, in the County of Gloucester.
| South Duffield Inclosure Act 1821 | 1 & 2 Geo. 4. c. 25 Pr. | 28 May 1821 |
An Act for repealing certain Parts of an Act of His present Majesty, intituled "An Act for inclosing Lands in the Township of South Duffield, in the Parish of Hemingbrough, in the East Riding of the County of York;" (Note: South Duffield Inclosure Act 1820 (1 Geo. 4. c. 26 Pr.)) and for amending and explaining the said Act.
| Ladbroke's Estate Act 1821 | 1 & 2 Geo. 4. c. 26 Pr. | 8 June 1821 |
An Act to enable James Weller Ladbrooke Esquire, and others, to grant Building Leases of Lands in Kensington, Paddington, Nottingbarns and Westborne, in the County of Middlesex.
| Smith's Estate Act 1821 | 1 & 2 Geo. 4. c. 27 Pr. | 8 June 1821 |
An Act for obviating Doubts as to the Power of the surviving Devisees in Trust under the Will of Sir Drummond Smith Baronet, to convey in the Lifetime of Dame Elizabeth Smith, his Widow, certain Freehold, Copyhold, and Leasehold Estates, situate in the Counties of Hertford and Buckingham, pursuant to a Contract entered into by the said Trustees and William Kay Esquire.
| Hunloke's Estate Act 1821 | 1 & 2 Geo. 4. c. 28 Pr. | 8 June 1821 |
An Act for vesting the devised Estates of Sir Thomas Windsor Hunloke Baronet, deceased, in Trustees and for enabling them to sell the Whole, or Part thereof, for the Purpose of discharging Incumbrances and creating a Fund to answer the Charges under his Will, and for other Purposes.
| Hinton Walrish Rectory Act 1821 | 1 & 2 Geo. 4. c. 29 Pr. | 8 June 1821 |
An Act for effecting an Exchange of Part of the Glebe Lands belonging to the Rectory of Hinton Walrish, in the County of Berks, for other Lands in the same Parish, belonging to John Loder Symonds Esquire.
| Gore's Estate Act 1821 | 1 & 2 Geo. 4. c. 30 Pr. | 8 June 1821 |
An Act for vesting Parts of the settled Estates of William Ormsby Gore Esquire and Mary Jane his Wife, in Trustees, upon Trust to sell and for laying out the Monies arising from such Sales in the Purchase of more convenient Estates.
| Whitley Inclosure Act 1821 | 1 & 2 Geo. 4. c. 31 Pr. | 8 June 1821 |
An Act for inclosing Lands in the Manor of Whitley, in the Parish of Kirkheaton, in the West Riding of the County of York.
| Easthampstead Inclosure Act 1821 | 1 & 2 Geo. 4. c. 32 Pr. | 8 June 1821 |
An Act for inclosing Lands within the Manor and Parish of Easthampstead, in the County of Berks.
| Llanrwst Inclosure Act 1821 | 1 & 2 Geo. 4. c. 33 Pr. | 8 June 1821 |
An Act to amend an Act of His late Majesty King George the Third, (Note: Llanrwst Inclosure Act 1812 (52 Geo. 3. c. 68 Pr.)) for inclosing Lands in the of Llanrwst in the several Counties of Denbigh and Carnarvon.
| Malmesbury Inclosure Act 1821 | 1 & 2 Geo. 4. c. 34 Pr. | 8 June 1821 |
An Act for dividing, allotting and inclosing a certain Piece of Land called King's Heath, or Malmsbury Common, situate near the Borough of Malmsbury, in the County of Wilts.
| Edgbaston Tithes Act 1821 | 1 & 2 Geo. 4. c. 35 Pr. | 8 June 1821 |
An Act to commute for a Corn Rent the Vicarial Tithes and Payments in lieu thereof, payable to the Vicar of the Parish of Edgbaston, in the County of Warwick.
| Farnham Inclosure Act 1821 | 1 & 2 Geo. 4. c. 36 Pr. | 15 June 1821 |
An Act for inclosing Lands in the Parish of Farnham Royal, in the County of Buckingham.
| Whittington Inclosure Act 1821 | 1 & 2 Geo. 4. c. 37 Pr. | 15 June 1821 |
An Act for inclosing Lands in the Parish of Whittington, in the County of Derby.
| Logan's Estate Act 1821 | 1 & 2 Geo. 4. c. 38 Pr. | 23 June 1821 |
An Act for vesting the Estates of John Logan, late of Knockshinnoch, in the County of Ayr, in Trustees, to be sold, and the Proceeds thereof and of his Personal Estate to be applied in Payment of his Debts and the Provisions made for his Children; and for laying out the Residue in the Purchase of other Lands, to be entailed in favour of the same Persons, and on the Conditions of the Deed of Entail executed by the said John Logan.
| Greenwich Hospital Act 1821 | 1 & 2 Geo. 4. c. 39 Pr. | 23 June 1821 |
An Act to empower the Warden and Poor Men of the Hospital of The Holy and Undivided Trinity in East Greenwich, of the Foundation of Henry Howard Earl of Northampton, to sell certain Estates in the Parish of Saint Martin in the Fields, in the County of Middlesex, to His Grace the Duke of Northumberland, and to apply the Money arising from such Sale in the Purchase of other Lands to be subject to the like Uses.
| Satterthwaite's Estate Act 1821 | 1 & 2 Geo. 4. c. 40 Pr. | 2 July 1821 |
An Act to enable the surviving Trustee under the Will of John Satterthwaite Esquire, deceased to sell the real Estates thereby devised, during the Lifetime of the Testator's Widow, and to pay the Purchase Monies into the Bank to be applied under the Directions of the Court of Chancery.
| Rowley Regis Estate Act 1821 | 1 & 2 Geo. 4. c. 41 Pr. | 2 July 1821 |
An Act to enable the Trustees of an Estate at Rowley Regis in the County of Stafford, belonging to Deritend Chapel, in the Parish of Aston, near Birmingham, in the County of Warwick, to demise the Mines under the same, and lay out the Money to arise therefrom in Lands, and apply the Rents in Manner therein mentioned.
| Marquis of Abercorn's Estate Act 1821 | 1 & 2 Geo. 4. c. 42 Pr. | 2 July 1821 |
An Act for enabling George Earl of Aberdeen and William Lord Bishop of London, the Guardians of James Marquis of Abercorn, a Minor, to make Freehold Leases of his Estates in Ireland, during his Minority.
| Embury's Estate Act 1821 | 1 & 2 Geo. 4. c. 43 Pr. | 10 July 1821 |
An Act for confirming a Partition of certain Estates in the County of Worcester, and for barring and otherwise disposing of the Estates Tail, and other Interests created by the Will of John Embury Esquire, deceased in the said Estates, and for other Purposes.
| Brownswood Prebend Act 1821 | 1 & 2 Geo. 4. c. 44 Pr. | 10 July 1821 |
An Act to enable the Prebendary of the Prebend of Brownswood, in the County of Middlesex, founded in the Cathedral Church of Saint Paul, in London, to grant a Lease of the Manor of Brownswood, in the said County, Parcel of the said Prebend, in manner therein mentioned, and to enable the granting of Sub Leases for building thereon, and otherwise improving the same, and for other Purposes.
| Avarne's Estate Act 1821 | 1 & 2 Geo. 4. c. 45 Pr. | 11 July 1821 |
An Act for effecting an Exchange of an Estate at Longdon, in the County of Stafford, devised by the Will of Thomas Jeffries Avarne, for an Estate at Abbots Bromley, in the said County, belonging to the Most Honourable Henry William Marquess of Anglesey.
| Hailey Inclosure Act 1821 (Note: This act was not printed by the King's Printer) | 1 & 2 Geo. 4. c. 46 Pr. | 24 March 1821 |
An Act for allotting Lands within the Hamlet or Township of Hailey, in the Parish of Witney, in the County of Oxford.
| Bromley Inclosure Act 1821 | 1 & 2 Geo. 4. c. 47 Pr. | 6 April 1821 |
An Act for inclosing Lands in the Parish of Bromley, in the County of Kent.
| Stapleford Abbott Inclosure Act 1821 | 1 & 2 Geo. 4. c. 48 Pr. | 19 April 1821 |
An Act for inclosing Lands within the Manor and Parish of Stapleford Abbot, in the County of Essex.
| Tempster Allotments Act 1821 | 1 & 2 Geo. 4. c. 49 Pr. | 28 May 1821 |
An Act for inclosing Lands in the Manor of Tempster otherwise Tiertref, in the County of Montgomery.
| Great Bookham Allotment Act 1821 | 1 & 2 Geo. 4. c. 50 Pr. | 28 May 1821 |
An Act for dividing and allotting Lands in the Parish of Great Bookham, in the County of Surrey.
| Bassingham Inclosure Act 1821 | 1 & 2 Geo. 4. c. 51 Pr. | 28 May 1821 |
An Act for inclosing Lands in the Parish of Basingham, in the County of Norfolk.
| Barningham Inclosure Act 1821 | 1 & 2 Geo. 4. c. 52 Pr. | 28 May 1821 |
An Act for inclosing Lands in the Parishes of Little Barningham and Calthorpe, in the County of Norfolk.
| Tangmere Inclosure Act 1821 | 1 & 2 Geo. 4. c. 53 Pr. | 28 May 1821 |
An Act for inclosing Lands in the Parish of Tangmere, in the County of Sussex.
| Felsted Inclosure Act 1821 | 1 & 2 Geo. 4. c. 54 Pr. | 28 May 1821 |
An Act for inclosing, dividing and allotting certain Common Land within the Parish of Felsted, in the County of Essex.
| Fernandes' Naturalization Act 1821 | 1 & 2 Geo. 4. c. 55 Pr. | 28 May 1821 |
An Act for naturalizing Jozé Luis Fernandes.
| Lloyd's Estate Act 1821 | 1 & 2 Geo. 4. c. 56 Pr. | 8 June 1821 |
An Act for obviating a Doubt arising on the Power of Sale and Exchange, contained in the Will of Francis Lloyd late of Domgay, in the County of Montgomery, Esquire, and for facilitating the Exercise of such Power.
| Barnwell Rectories Act 1821 | 1 & 2 Geo. 4. c. 57 Pr. | 8 June 1821 |
An Act for uniting the Rectory and Parish Church of Barnwell All Saints, with the adjoining Rectory and Parish Church of Barnwell Saint Andrew, both in the County of Northampton.
| Pattiswick Inclosure Act 1821 | 1 & 2 Geo. 4. c. 58 Pr. | 8 June 1821 |
An Act for dividing and inclosing the Common called Pattiswick Green, and other Waste Lands, within the Manor of Fering cum Pattiswick, and Parish of Pattiswick, in the County of Essex.
| Viscount Glerawly's Divorce Act 1821 | 1 & 2 Geo. 4. c. 59 Pr. | 8 June 1821 |
An Act to dissolve the Marriage of the Honourable William Richard Annesley, commonly called Lord Viscount Glerawly, with the Honourable Isabella, commonly called Viscountess Glerawly, his Wife; and to enable him to marry again; and for other Purposes therein mentioned.

=== Sources ===
- The Statutes of the United Kingdom of Great Britain and Ireland, 1 & 2 George IV. 1821. London. 1821 – via Internet Archive.
- The Statutes of the United Kingdom of Great Britain and Ireland, 1 & 2 George IV. 1821. London. 1821 – via Google Books.
- Journals of the House of Commons. Vol. 76. London: His Majesty's Stationery Office. pp. 3–505 – via Google Books.

== See also ==
- List of acts of the Parliament of the United Kingdom
