= Discovery of North-West Passage Act 1744 =

Act of the Parliament of Great Britain

- Act of Parliament
- Parliament of Great Britain
- Long title: An Act for giving a public Reward to such Person or Persons, His Majesty's Subject or Subjects, as shall discover a North-west Passage, through Hudson's Streights, to the Western and Southern Ocean of America.
- Citation: 18 Geo. 2. c. 17
- Territorial extent: Great Britain

Dates
- Royal assent: 2 May 1745
- Commencement: 27 November 1744 (Note: Start of session.)
- Repealed: 8 May 1818
Other legislation
Repealed by	Discovery of Longitude at Sea, etc. Act 1818
Relates to	Discovery of Northern Passage Act 1776

Status: Repealed

Text of statute as originally enacted

The Discovery of North-West Passage Act 1744 (18 Geo. 2. c. 17) was an act of the Parliament of Great Britain passed in 1745 and repealed in 1818. It offered a public reward for the successful discovery of a Northwest Passage from the Atlantic to the Pacific.

The preamble to the act stated the expected economic benefits of the discovery of the passage, and that it would be "a great encouragement to adventurers" to offer a prize. The allocated sum was £20,000, to be paid to the owners of the first ships to successfully make such a passage.

The act established a group of commissioners to determine the validity of any claims, and restricted the scope of the act to only apply to British subjects. It further required all British subjects to provide help and assistance to the explorers when required.

== Subsequent developments ==
The whole act was repealed by section 9 of the Discovery of Longitude at Sea, etc. Act 1818 (58 Geo. 3. c. 20).
