= 1718 in Great Britain =

Events from the year 1718 in Great Britain.

== Incumbents ==
- Monarch – George I

== Events ==
- 7 January – Religious Worship Act 1718 repeals the Occasional Conformity Act 1711 and Schism Act 1714, restoring some freedoms to dissenters.
- 21 March – Piracy Act 1717 receives royal assent, providing the punishment of penal transportation (to British North America) as an alternative to a death sentence for lesser crimes.
- 30 April – the proper motion of stars is demonstrated by Edmond Halley.
- 15 May – James Puckle patents the Puckle Gun.
- 2 August – Quadruple Alliance formed between Britain, the Kingdom of France, the Holy Roman Empire and the Dutch Republic.
- 11 August – a British fleet under Admiral Byng defeats a Spanish fleet at the Battle of Cape Passaro, a prelude to the War of the Quadruple Alliance.
- 17 December – War of the Quadruple Alliance: Britain, the Kingdom of France, the Holy Roman Empire and the Dutch Republic declare war on Spain.

=== Undated ===
- Marrow Controversy, an ecclesiastical dispute in Scotland, begins.
- Greenwich Hospital receives a Royal Charter (revoked in 1829).
- The Hovering Act makes it illegal for vessels under 50 tons to linger offshore, in an attempt to prevent smuggling.

== Births ==
- 18 February – Robert Henry, historian (died 1790)
- 4 April – Benjamin Kennicott, churchman and Hebrew scholar (died 1783)
- 7 April – Hugh Blair, preacher and man of letters (died 1800)
- 17 May – Robert Darcy, 4th Earl of Holderness, diplomat and politician (died 1778)
- 23 May – William Hunter, anatomist (died 1783)
- 30 May – Wills Hill, 1st Marquess of Downshire, politician (died 1793)
- 5 June – Thomas Chippendale, furniture maker (died 1779)
- 17 June – George Howard, field marshal (died 1796)
- 5 July – Francis Seymour-Conway, 1st Marquess of Hertford, Viceroy of Ireland (died 1794)
- 31 July – John Canton, physicist (died 1772)
- 3 November – John Montagu, 4th Earl of Sandwich, statesman (died 1792)

== Deaths ==
- 6 January – Richard Hoare, goldsmith and banker (born 1648)
- 1 February – Charles Talbot, 1st Duke of Shrewsbury, politician (born 1660)
- 17 February – Charlotte Lee, Countess of Lichfield, heiress (born 1664)
- 18 February – Peter Anthony Motteux, dramatist and editor, probably murdered (born 1663 in France)
- 30 July – William Penn, Quaker and founder of the Pennsylvania colony (born 1644)
- 26 September – William Okeden, politician (born 1662)
- 22 November – Blackbeard, pirate, killed in action (born c. 1680)
- 6 December – Nicholas Rowe, poet laureate and dramatist (born 1674)

== See also ==
- 1718 in Wales
