= Statute Law Revision Act 1887 =

Act of the Parliament of the United Kingdom

Statute Law Revision Act 1887 (Note: Section 2.)
- Act of Parliament
- Parliament of the United Kingdom
- Long title: An Act for further promoting the Revision of the Statute Law by repealing certain Enactments which have ceased to be in force or have become unnecessary.
- Citation: 50 & 51 Vict. c. 59
- Introduced by: Hardinge Giffard, 1st Baron Halsbury (Lords)
- Territorial extent: United Kingdom

Dates
- Royal assent: 16 September 1887
- Commencement: 16 September 1887 (Note: The Acts of Parliament (Commencement) Act 1793.)
Other legislation
Amends	See § Repealed enactments
Repeals/revokes	See § Repealed enactments
Amended by	Statute Law Revision Act 1908
Relates to	Repeal of Obsolete Statutes Act 1856; See Statute Law Revision Act; Sheriffs Act 1887; Coroners Act 1887

Status: Partially repealed

History of passage through Parliament

Records of Parliamentary debate relating to the statute from Hansard

Text of statute as originally enacted

The Statute Law Revision Act 1887 (50 & 51 Vict. c. 59) is an act of the Parliament of the United Kingdom that repealed for the United Kingdom enactments from 1275 to 1822 which had ceased to be in force or had become necessary. The act was intended, in particular, to facilitate the preparation of the new edition of the revised edition of the statutes, then in progress.

As of 2026, the act remains partly in force in the United Kingdom.

== Background ==
In the United Kingdom, acts of Parliament remain in force until expressly repealed. Blackstone's Commentaries on the Laws of England, published in the late 18th-century, raised questions about the system and structure of the common law and the poor drafting and disorder of the existing statute book.

From 1810 to 1825, The Statutes of the Realm was published, providing the first authoritative collection of acts. The first statute law revision act was not passed until 1856 with the Repeal of Obsolete Statutes Act 1856 (19 & 20 Vict. c. 64). This approach—focusing on removing obsolete laws from the statute book followed by consolidation—was proposed by Peter Locke King MP, who had been highly critical of previous commissions' approaches, expenditures, and lack of results.

Previous statute law revision acts
Year passed	Title	Citation	Effect
1861	Statute Law Revision Act 1861	24 & 25 Vict. c. 101	Repealed or amended over 800 enactments
1863	Statute Law Revision Act 1863	26 & 27 Vict. c. 125	Repealed or amended over 1,600 enactments for England and Wales
1867	Statute Law Revision Act 1867	30 & 31 Vict. c. 59	Repealed or amended over 1,380 enactments
1870	Statute Law Revision Act 1870	33 & 34 Vict. c. 69	Repealed or amended over 250 enactments
1871	Promissory Oaths Act 1871	34 & 35 Vict. c. 48	Repealed or amended almost 200 enactments
1871	Statute Law Revision Act 1871	34 & 35 Vict. c. 116	Repealed or amended over 1,060 enactments
1872	Statute Law Revision Act 1872	35 & 36 Vict. c. 63	Repealed or amended almost 490 enactments
1872	Statute Law (Ireland) Revision Act 1872	35 & 36 Vict. c. 98	Repealed or amended over 1,050 enactments
1872	Statute Law Revision Act 1872 (No. 2)	35 & 36 Vict. c. 97	Repealed or amended almost 260 enactments
1873	Statute Law Revision Act 1873	36 & 37 Vict. c. 91	Repealed or amended 1,225 enactments
1874	Statute Law Revision Act 1874	37 & 38 Vict. c. 35	Repealed or amended over 490 enactments
1874	Statute Law Revision Act 1874 (No. 2)	37 & 38 Vict. c. 96	Repealed or amended almost 470 enactments
1875	Statute Law Revision Act 1875	38 & 39 Vict. c. 66	Repealed or amended over 1,400 enactments
1876	Statute Law Revision (Substituted Enactments) Act 1876	39 & 40 Vict. c. 20	Updated references to repealed acts
1878	Statute Law Revision (Ireland) Act 1878	41 & 42 Vict. c. 57	Repealed or amended over 460 enactments passed by the Parliament of Ireland
1878	Statute Law Revision Act 1878	41 & 42 Vict. c. 79	Repealed or amended over 90 enactments.
1879	Statute Law Revision (Ireland) Act 1879	42 & 43 Vict. c. 24	Repealed or amended over 460 enactments passed by the Parliament of Ireland
1879	Civil Procedure Acts Repeal Act 1879	42 & 43 Vict. c. 59	Repealed or amended over 130 enactments
1881	Statute Law Revision and Civil Procedure Act 1881	44 & 45 Vict. c. 59	Repealed or amended or amended almost 100 enactments relating to civil procedure.
1883	Statute Law Revision Act 1883	46 & 47 Vict. c. 39	Repealed or amended over 475 enactments
1883	Statute Law Revision and Civil Procedure Act 1883	46 & 47 Vict. c. 49	Repealed or amended over 475 enactments

== Passage ==
The Statute Law Revision Bill had its first reading in the House of Lords on 28 July 1887, introduced by the Lord Chancellor, Hardinge Giffard, 1st Baron Halsbury. The bill had its second reading in the House of Lords on 1 August 1887 and was committed to a committee of the whole house, which met on 2 August 1887 and reported on 4 August 1887, with amendments. The amended bill had its third reading in the House of Lords on 5 August 1887 and passed, with amendments.

The amended bill had its first reading in the House of Commons on 15 August 1887. The bill had its second reading in the House of Commons on 10 September 1887 and was committed to a committee of the whole house, which met on 10 September 1887 and 12 September 1887 and reported on 12 September 1887, with amendments. The amended bill had its third reading in the House of Commons on 12 September 1887 and passed, with amendments.

The amended bill was considered and agreed to by the House of Lords on 13 September 1887.

The bill was granted royal assent on 16 September 1887.

== Subsequent developments ==
Several acts repealed by this act were already repealed by the Sheriffs Act 1887 (50 & 51 Vict. c. 55), which was passed simultaneously.

The act was intended, in particular, to facilitate the preparation of the new edition of the revised edition of the statutes.

The enactments which were repealed (whether for the whole or any part of the United Kingdom) by the act were repealed so far as they extended to the Isle of Man by section 1(1) of, and schedule 1 to, the Statute Law Revision (Isle of Man) Act 1991, which came into force on 25 July 1991.

The act was retained for the Republic of Ireland by section 2(2)(a) of, and part 4 of schedule 1 to, the Statute Law Revision Act 2007, which came into force on 8 May 2007.

The schedule to the act was repealed by section 1 of, and the schedule to, the Statute Law Revision Act 1908 (8 Edw. 7. c. 49)), which came into force on 21 December 1908.

== Repealed enactments ==
Section 1 of the act repealed 203 enactments, listed in the schedule to the act, across six categories: (Note: The Note of the bill, unlike the schedule, gives commentary on each act, noting any earlier repeals and the reason for the new repeal.)

- Expired
- Spent
- Repealed in general terms
- Virtually repealed
- Superseded
- Obsolete

Section 1 of the act included several safeguards to ensure that the repeal does not negatively affect existing rights or ongoing legal matters. Specifically, any legal rights, privileges, or remedies already obtained under the repealed laws, as well as any legal proceedings or principles established by them, remain unaffected. Section 1 of the act also ensured that repealed enactments that have been incorporated into other laws would continue to have legal effect in those contexts. Moreover, the repeal would not revive any former rights, offices, or jurisdictions that had already been abolished.

Citation	Short title	Title	Extent of repeal
3 Edw. 1. c. 6	Amercements	Amerciaments shall be reasonable.	The words "city, borough, nor town nor any."
3 Edw. 1. c. 31	Tolls in markets and murage	Excessive Toll in Market towns.	From "Touching citizens" to "the King."
3 Edw. 1. c. 34	Slanderous reports	Of slanderous reports.	The whole act.
12 Edw. 1. c. 1—14	Statuta Wallie	Statuta Wallie (the Statuta of Wales).	The whole act.
13 Edw. 1. (Stat. West. Sec.) c. 1	Statute of Westminster 1285	Several sorts of gifts of lands, now void.	From "And forsomuch as" to "Chancery."
25 Edw. 1. (Magna Carta) c. 32	Restraint on alienation of land	Alienation.	The whole act.
25 Edw. 1. (Confirmatio Chartarum) c. 3	N/A	The charters shall be read in the Cathedrals.	The whole act.
25 Edw. 1. (Confirmatio Chartarum) c. 4	N/A	The breakers of the charters shall be excommunicated.	The whole act.
25 Edw. 1. (Stat. de Tallag.) c. 5	N/A	Pardon granted to certain offenders.	The whole act.
25 Edw. 1. (Stat. de Tallag.) c. 6	N/A	Excommunication shall be pronounced against the breakers of this charter.	The whole act.
27 Edw. 1 (Ordin. de Lib. Perq.)	Ordinatio de Libertatibus perquirendis	An Ordinance of purchasing Liberties.	The whole act.
Stat. temp. incert. (St. de Consp.)	Statutum de Conspiratoribus	Statute concerning Conspirators.	From "Our Lord the King" to end of statute.
Stat. temp. incert. (Modus fac. hom. et fid.)	Modus faciendi Homagium et Fidelitatem	The manner of doing homage and fealty.	The whole act.
Stat. temp. incert. Juramentum Majorum et Ballivorum.	Juramentum Majorum et Ballivorum	The oath of Mayors and Bailiffs.	The whole act.
5 Edw. 3. c. 8	Custody by Marshals of King's Bench Act 1331	Of the custody of prisoners by Marshalls of King's Bench and Bail.	The penalty for letting prisoners go at large, or escape.
18 Edw. 3. Stat. 2	Taxation Act 1344	Grant to the King of two-fifteenths and two-tenths, by the Commons.	From the beginning of the statute to "defence of the North."
18 Edw. 3. Stat. 3. c. 1	Exemption of Prelates from Secular Jurisdiction Act 1344	Grant to the King by the Clergy.	From the beginning of the chapter to "Saint John Baptist."
25 Edw. 3. Stat. 6. c. 9	An Ordinance for the Clergy Indictments of ordinaries for extortion	Indictments of Ordinances for extortion must be certain.	The whole act.
28 Edw. 3. c. 2	Lords of Marches of Wales	Lords of Marches of Wales annexed to Crown.	The whole act.
2 Ric. 2. c. 5	Scandalum Magnatum Act 1378	The penalty for taking money from the great men of the realm.	The whole act.
12 Ric. 2. c. 11	Penalty for slandering great men	Reporters of lies against peers, &c. shall be punished by the Council.	The whole act.
1 Hen. 4. c. 6	Petitions to the King for Lands	In petitions to the King for lands, offices, &c., the value thereof shall be mentioned.	The whole act.
2 Hen. 4. c. 2	Petitions to the King for Lands Act 1400	Recital of the Statute 1 Hen. 4. c. 6. respecting grants of the King. Exposition thereof as to mention of former grants of the King, &c.	The whole act.
2 Hen. 4. c. 4	Purchasing bulls to be discharged of tithes	All persons presenting bills to be discharged of tithes shall incur the penalties of 13 Ric. 2. St. 2. c. 4, 5.	The whole act.
6 Hen. 4. c. 2	Petitions to the King for Lands	The Statute 1 Hen. 4. c. 6. respecting petitions to the King for lands, &c. shall not extend to the Queen nor the princes.	The whole act.
7 Hen. 4. c. 6	Bulls to be Discharged of Tithes	The penalty for purchasing bulls to be discharged of tithes as under Statute 2 Hen. 4. c. 4.	The whole act.
1 Edw. 4. c. 2	Sheriff's Tourn Act 1461	Unlawful Indictments in Sheriffs' Tourns found by mean persons, &c.	The whole act. (Note: This act was already repealed by the Sheriffs Act 1887 (50 & 51 Vict. c. 55).)
11 Hen. 7. c. 15	Sheriff's County Court Act 1495	An Acts agaynst Shriffe and Under-Shriffe.	The whole act. (Note: This act was already repealed by the Sheriffs Act 1887 (50 & 51 Vict. c. 55).)
19 Hen. 7. c. 7	Ordinances of Corporations Act 1503	De privatis statutis statuend.	Section three.
22 Hen. 8. c. 4	Apprentices' Fees Act 1530	An Acte concernyng the weytyng of Exaccyons levyed upon Tenysons.	The whole act.
27 Hen. 8. c. 5	Justice of the Peace (Chester and Wales) Act 1535	An Acte for making of Justice of peace in Wales.	The whole act.
27 Hen. 8. c. 20	Tithes Act 1535	An Acte concernyng an Order for Tithes through the Realme.	Except such tithes, offerings, and duties which have been commuted, or are otherwise still payable.
27 Hen. 8. c. 26	Laws in Wales Act 1535	An Acte for Lawes and Justice to be ministred in Wales in like fourme as it is in this Realme.	Sections two, from "and beyng noo parcell" to "reformacion whereof," three from beginning of section to "into several shires," five from "Sherife of the" to dwelling in this Realme of England," and from "and that Shirife and Escheators" to end of section eight, and from "and that the Shireffes of Mountgomery and Denbigh, frome and after the said feaste of All Saintes, shall yerely make their accompts before the Kinges Auditors and suche Chambreleyn or Baron of the said Eschequier as shalbe thereunto appoynted by our said Soverayne Lorde the Kynge in such like fourme as the Officers and mynistres do yerely make their accomptes in the Kinges Exchequier at Westmynster within this Realme of England; And that," and from "and according to such other Customes" to "Lords the Kings," eighteen to twenty-one, twenty-two from "And that the same Knyghtes" to "the said Shire of Burgeis," and from "And that the Knyghtes and Burgeis" to end of section, twenty-three to thirty-two.
28 Hen. 8. c. 5	Apprentices Act 1536	An Acte for avoydyng of exaccyons taken upon Prentesis in the Cyties Boroughes and Townes corpatt.	
32 Hen. 8. c. 2	Limitation of Prescription Act 1540	Lymitacion of Prescription.	The whole act.
32 Hen. 8. c. 7	Tithe Act 1540	Payment of tithes enforced.	Except as to tithes, offerings, and duties which have not been commuted or are otherwise still payable, and except section five.
33 Hen. 8. c. 13	Lordships of Wales Act 1541	An Acte concerninge then Lordshippes inlated from the countrey of Denbigh to the countye of Flintshire.	Preamble, and sections one and two.
34 & 35 Hen. 8. c. 26	Laws in Wales Act 1542	An Acte for certaine Ordinaunces in the Kinges Majesties Domynion and Principalitie of Wales.	Sections three to eight, eleven to twenty, twenty-one from beginning of section to "Constablii," and thirteen "unto me to make"; and from "Item that no Justice of the Peace" to "Clerke of the Peas" to end of section; twenty-two from "And for the yerely" to "Audnances assigned for Wales," and from "saide President" to "and allso of the," and from "Item that the saide Shiriffe shall yerely" to end of section, twenty-three to twenty-five, twenty-seven to thirty, thirty-three to growen to the contrarye there of notwithstandinge," thirty-four, thirty-five, thirty-nine from "upon oerteinet" to knowledge," and the words "out of the Chauncerye of England" in section forty, forty-one to forty-four, forty-five to forty-six, forty-seven, the words "the saide President and Counsell or," forty-eight, forty-nine, fifty from "lynes given and provided" to end of section, fifty-one, fifty-two, the words "Felonye goodes and threyshire" in fifty-five, sixty, sixty-one from "made and proved" and from "and that the saide Seall" to "seye of the saide Shyre of Pembrohe Carmarden and Cardigan," sixty-two to sixty-five.
37 Hen. 8. c. 1	Custos Rotulorum Act 1545	An Acte for the offices of the Grete Master Rueler.	Sections two, three, and four from "that the Archebishoppe" to "successors and."
1 Edw. 6. c. 10	Exigents, etc. in Wales and Cheshire Act 1547	An Acte for exigents and proclamations in Wales, and in the Counties Palatine of Chester, and Durham.	So much as relates to outlawry, except outlawry in criminal proceedings.
1 Edw. 6. c. 12	Treason Act 1547	An Acte for the repeale of certain Statutes concerninge treasons, felonyes, &c.	Preamble and section two.
2 & 3 Edw. 6. c. 13	Easter Offerings and Tithes Act 1548	An Acte for the true payment of tithes.	Except as to tithes, offerings, and duties which have not been commuted or are otherwise still payable.
2 & 3 Edw. 6. c. 21	Clergy Marriage Act 1548	An Acte to take awaye all posityve Lawes againste Marriage of Priestes.	Section three.
5 & 6 Edw. 6. c. 12	Clergy Marriage Act 1551	An Acte for the declaracion of a Statute made for the Marriage of Priests and for the legittimatione of their children.	Section four.
5 & 6 Edw. 6. c. 26	Proclamations and Exigents (Lancaster) Act 1551	An Act for Writtes uppon pelamacious and exigente to be currant within the Countye Palatyne of Lancaster.	So much as relates to outlawry, except outlawry in criminal proceedings.
1 & 2 Phil. & Mar.. c. 15	Lords Marches in Wales Act 1554	An Act touching the Lyberties of the Lordes Marchers in Wales.	The whole act.
2 & 3 Phil. & Mar.. c. 18	Commissioners of Peace in Boroughs Act 1555	An Acte touching Comissions of the Peace and Gaole delyvery in Townes corporate, not being counties in themselves.	The whole act.
5 Eliz.. c. 9	Perjury Act 1562	An Act for the punyshment of suche persones as shall procure or commit any wyllfull perjurye.	Section seven, from "sworne by force of Parliament" to "in the northe nor."
27 Eliz.. c. 9	Fines and Recoveries Act 1584	An Act for Reformation of Errors in Fynes and recoveries in the xij Shires of Wales and Towne and Countie of Haverford West with the Counties Palatine.	The whole act.
31 Eliz.. c. 9	Proclamations and Exigents (Durham) Act 1588	An Acte that Writtes of Proclamacion uppon Exigentes to be currant within the Countye Palatine of Durham.	So much as relates to outlawry, except outlawry in criminal proceedings.
21 Ja. 1. c. 10	Laws in Wales (Amendment) Act 1623	An Acte of repeale of one Braunche of a Statute made in the xxiiijth yere of King Henry the Eight.	The whole act.
16 Cha. 1. c. 11	Abolition of High Commission Court Act 1640	An Act for repeal of a branch of a Statute primo Elizabethe concerning Commissioners for causes Ecclesiastical.	Preamble and section one.
13 Cha. 2. c. 4	Illegality of Benevolences, etc. Act 1661	An Act for a free and voluntary Psent to his Majesty.	Section section five.
14 Cha. 2. c. 12 (Note: 13 & 14. Ruff.)	Poor Relief Act 1662	An Act for the better Releife of the Poore of this Kingdom.	Sections three and twenty.
16 Cha. 2. c. 1	Triennial Parliaments Act 1664	An Act for the assembling and holding of Parliaments once in Three years at the least. And for the repeale of an Act entitled An Act for preventing inconveniences happening by the long Intermission of Parliaments.	The whole act.
25 Cha. 2. c. 9	Durham (Representation of) Act 1672	An Act to enable the County Palatine of Durham to send Knights and Burgesses to serve in Parliament.	The whole act.
3 Will. & Mar.. c. 11	Poor Relief Act 1691	An Act for the better explanation and supplying the defects of the former Laws for the Settlement of the Poor.	From the beginning of the Act down to "intents and purposes, and that."
7 & 8 Will. 3. c. 6	Recovery of Small Tithes Act 1695	An Act for the more easy Recovery of small Tythes.	Except as to tithes, offerings, and compositions which have not been commuted, or are otherwise still payable.
8 & 9 Will. 3. c. 27	Escape of Debtors, etc. Act 1696	An Act for the more effectual Relief of Creditors in Cases of Escapes, and for preventing Abuses in Prisons and privileged Places.	Section two and section seventeen from beginning to "provided nevertheless."
11 Will. 3. c. 16	Tithes of Hemp and Flax Act 1698	An Act for the better ascertaining the Tythes of Hemp and Flax.	The whole act.
1 Ann. Stat. 2. c. 6	Escape of Debtors from Prison Act 1702	An Act for preventing Escapes out of the Queen's Bench and Fleet Prisons.	Section five from the beginning down to "provided against."
1 Ann. Stat. 2. c. 21 (Note: Chapter XVII. in common printed editions.)	Treason Act 1702	An Act the title of which begins with the words "An Act for enlarging the Time," and ends with the words "secret Abettors."	The title from "for enlarging" to "appointed and," and from "and for extending."
6 Ann. c. 12 (Note: Chapter IX., 5 & 6 Ann., in common printed editions.)	Prison (Escape) Act 1706	An Act for rendering more effectual an Act named in the ninth year of Her Majestie's Reign, intituled "An Act for the better preventing Escapes out of the Queen's Bench and Fleet Prisons."	Section six.
6 Ann. c. 24	Queen Anne's Bounty Act 1706	An Act for the better collecting charity money on Briefs by Letters Patents, and preventing Abuses in relation to such Charities.	Section six.
6 Ann. c. 54 (Note: Chapter XXVII., 6 Ann., in common printed editions.)	Queen Anne's Bounty Act 1707	An Act the title of which begins with the words "An Act to enlarge," and ends with the words "First Fruits and Tenths and all arrears thereof."	Sections two, three, four.
6 Ann. c. 68 (Note: Chapter XVI., 6 Ann., in common printed editions.)	City of London (Garbling of Spices and Admission of Brokers) Act 1707	An Act for repealing the Act of the first year of King James the First, intituled "An Act for the well garbling of Spices, and for granting other duties to the City of London by admitting Brokers."	The title from "and for granting" to end of title, and section four.
7 Ann. c. 12	Diplomatic Privileges Act 1708	An Act preserving the privileges of Ambassadors and other publick Ministers of Foreign Princes and States.	Section seven to "pleading and."
7 Ann. c. 20	Middlesex Registry Act 1708	An Act the title of which begins with the words "An Act for the" and ends with the words "and nine."	Section twenty-one.
7 Ann. c. 30 (Note: Chapter VII. in common printed editions.)	Bank of England Act 1708	An Act for charging and continuing the Duties upon Bank of England, and for raising a further supply to Her Majesty for the Service of the year one thousand seven hundred and nine.	The title from "and for raising" to end of title, and section seventy-five.
9 Ann. c. 6	Lotteries Act 1710	An Act the title of which begins with the words "An Act for reviving," and ends with the words "Insurance Offices as are therein mentioned."	The title from "for reviving" to "eleven and," and the words "and such Insurance."
10 Ann. c. 28 (Note: Chapter XVIII. in common printed editions.)	Pleading Act 1711	An Act the title of which begins with the words "An Act for," and ends with the words "more easie."	The title from "to give" to "limited and."
13 Ann. c. 6 (Note: Chapter VI., 12 Ann. Stat. 2., in common printed editions.)	Mortuaries (Bangor, &c.) Abolition Act 1713	An Act the title of which begins with the words "An Act for taking away Mortuaries," and ends with the words "Catherine Hall in Cambridge."	The title from "and for confirming" to end of title.
13 Ann. c. 13 (Note: Chapter XIV., 12 Ann. Stat. 2., in common printed editions.)	Presentation of Benefices Act 1713	An Act the title of which begins with the words "An Act for rendering more effectual," and ends with the words "Act mentioned."	The title from "And for resting" to end of title.
1 Geo. 1. Stat. 2. c. 6	Tithes and Church Rates Recovery Act 1714	An Act the title of which begins with the words "An Act for making," and ends with the words "Oath of Abjuration."	The title from "and for appointing" to end of title.
1 Geo. 1. Stat. 2. c. 48	Preservation of Timber Trees Act 1715	An Act to encourage the planting of Timber Trees, Fruit Trees, and other Trees, for Ornament, Shelter, or Profit; and for the better Preservation of the same; and for the preventing the burning of Woods.	The whole act.
3 Geo. 1. c. 8	Bank of England Act 1716	An Act the title of which begins with the words "An Act for redeeming," and ends with the words "in this Act mentioned."	The title from "and for securing" to "the Rate of Five Pounds per Centum."
4 Geo. 1. c. 11	Piracy Act 1717	An Act for the further preventing Robbery, Burglary, and other Felonies; and for the more effectual Transportation of Felons and unlawful Exporters of Wooll; and for declaring the Law upon some Points relating to Pirates.	The title from "for the further" to "Wooll and."
6 Geo. 1. c. 11	Plate Duty Act 1719	An Act the title which begins with the words "An Act for laying a Duty," and ends with the words "one thousand seven hundred and sixteen."	The title from "and for applying" to end of title.
6 Geo. 1. c. 16	Preservation of Timber Trees, etc. (Scotland) Act 1719	An Act the title of which begins with the words "An Act to explain," and ends with the words "of such Books."	The whole act.
7 Geo. 1. St. 1. c. 27	Pension Duties Act 1720	An Act the title of which begins with the words "An Act for raising," and ends with the words "East India Company."	The title from "and for transferring" to end of title.
8 Geo. 1. c. 2	Lotteries Act 1721	An Act the title of which begins with the words "An Act for continuing," and ends with the words "the Exchequer."	The title from "for continuing" to "certificates and," and from "and for enlarging" to end of title.
8 Geo. 1. c. 21	South Sea Company Act 1721	An Act the title of which begins with the words "An Act to enable," and ends with the words "therein mentioned."	The whole act.
9 Geo. 1. c. 7	Poor Relief Act 1722	An Act for the better putting into Execution the Laws relating to the Settlement, Employment, and Relief of the Poor.	Preamble; sections one, two, four.
9 Geo. 1. c. 19	Lotteries Act 1722	An Act the title of which begins with the words "An Act to continue" and ends with the words "twenty-three."	The title from "to continue" to "Widdrington and," and from "and for examining" to "Mercy," and from "and to give."
11 Geo. 1. c. 4	Municipal Elections Act 1724	An Act the title of which begins with the words "An Act for preventing" and ends with the words "afterwards made."	The whole act.
11 Geo. 1. c. 9	National Debt Reduction Act 1724	An Act the title of which begins with the words "An Act for continuing" and ends with the words "Bank Bills or Notes."	The title from "for proceeding" to end of title.
11 Geo. 1. c. 30	Adulteration of Tea and Coffee Act 1724	An Act the title of which begins with the words "An Act for more effectual" and ends with the words "Policies of Insurance."	The title from "for preventing" to end of title.
1 Geo. 2. St. 1. c. 5 (Note: Cited as 1 Geo. 2. c. 5.)	Demise of the Crown Act 1727	An Act the title of which begins with the words "An Act for making," and ends with the words "of Parliament."	The title from "for making" to "such offices, and" and from "and for continuing" to end of title.
1 Geo. 2. St. 2. c. 8 (Note: Cited as 1 Geo. 2. c. 8.)	Bank of England Act 1727	An Act the title of which begins with the words "An Act for granting" and ends with the words "Civil List Revenues."	The title from "and for further" to end of title.
2 Geo. 2. c. 25	Perjury Act 1728	An Act for the more effectual preventing and further punishment of Forgery, Perjury, and Subornation of Perjury; and to make it Felony to steal Bonds, Notes, or other Securities for Payment of Money.	The whole act.
2 Geo. 2. c. 28	Unlawful Games Act 1728	An Act the title of which begins with the words "An Act to revive" and ends with the words "and Alehouses."	The title from "to revive" to "forma pauperia," and from "for continuing" to end of title.
3 Geo. 2. c. 14	East India Company Act 1729	An Act the title of which begins with the words "An Act for reducing" and ends with the words "therein mentioned."	The whole act.
5 Geo. 2. c. 7	Recovery of Debts in American Plantations Act 1731	An Act for the more Easy Recovery of Debts in His Majesty's Plantations and Colonies in America.	The whole act.
6 Geo. 2. c. 35	Lotteries Act 1732	An Act the title of which begins with the words "An Act for appointing" and ends with the words "said Corporation."	The title from "for appointing" to "suffered and" and from "and for impowering" to end of title. Section thirty-two from "And so it" to "notice and."
8 Geo. 2. c. 13	Engraving Copyright Act 1734	An Act for the Encouragement of the Arts of Designing, Engraving, and Etching Historical and other Prints, by vesting the Properties thereof in the Inventors and Engravers during the Time therein mentioned.	Section six.
9 Geo. 2. c. 5	Witchcraft Act 1735	An Act, the title of which begins with the words "An Act to repeal" and ends with the words "or Conjuration."	The title from "to repeal" to "insnits Witchcraft, and." Section two from "and" to "one hour."
9 Geo. 2. c. 33	Lobsters (Scotland) Act 1735	An Act, the title of which begins with the words "An Act to repeal" and ends with the words "of Scotland."	The title from "to render" to "Son, and."
11 Geo. 2. c. 17	Church Patronage Act 1737	An Act the title of which begins with the words "An Act for securing" and ends with the words "to Papists."	The title from "for securing" to "Papists; and."
12 Geo. 2. c. 26	Plate (Offences) Act 1738	An Act for the better preventing Frauds and Abuses in Gold and Silver Wares.	Section seventeen.
12 Geo. 2. c. 29	County Rates Act 1738	An Act for the more easy assessing, collecting, and levying of County Rates.	Preamble, and sections one to five, eight from beginning of section to "on such account or accompts and," and the words "and inght determine," nine from beginning of section to "considerable," eleven, twelve, thirteen fourteen from "after presentment" to "reparation of such bridges towerpaths, ports, or coprs," and from "And that such justices" to "works aforesaid," fifteen to nineteen.
13 Geo. 2. c. 18	Laws Continuance, etc. Act 1739	An Act the title of which begins with the words "An Act to continue" and ends with the words "within this Realm."	The title from "to continue" to "Commissions; and" and from "and for extending" to end of title.
13 Geo. 2. c. 19	Gaming Act 1739	An Act to restrain and prevent the excessive Increase of Horse Races, and for amending an Act made in the last Session of Parliament, entitled "An Act for the more effectual preventing of excessive and deceitful Gaming."	The title from "amending" to "races, and." Section ten.
14 Geo. 2. c. 33	Bridges Act 1740	An Act to supply some defects in the laws for repairing and rebuilding county bridges, for repairing, enlarging, erecting, and providing houses of correction, and for the passing rogues and vagabonds.	The title from "for repairing enlarging" to end of title.
15 Geo. 2. c. 13	Bank of England Act 1741	An Act for establishing an agreement with the Governor and Company of the Bank of England for advancing the sum of one million six hundred thousand pounds towards the supply for the service of the year One thousand seven hundred and forty-two.	Section fourteen.
15 Geo. 2. c. 20	Gold and Silver Thread Act 1741	An Act to prevent the counterfeiting of Gold and Silver Lace; and for settling and adjusting the Proportions of fine Silver and Silk; and for the better making of Gold and Silver Thread.	Section fifteen.
15 Geo. 2. c. 33	Starr and Bent Act 1741	An Act the title of which begins with the words "An Act to revive" and ends with the words "or Bent."	The title from "to revive" to end of title.
17 Geo. 2. c. 40	Universities (Wine Licences) Act 1743	An Act the title of which begins with the words "An Act to continue" and ends with the words "without License."	The title from "to continue" to "War; and."
18 Geo. 2. c. 18	Parliamentary Elections Act 1744	An Act to explain and amend the Laws touching the Elections of Knights of the Shires to serve in Parliament for that Part of Great Britain called England.	Section fifteen.
19 Geo. 2. c. 9	Jurors (Scotland) Act 1745	An Act the title of which begins with the words "An Act for the more easy," and ends with the words "called Scotland."	The title from "securing" to "Majesty, and."
19 Geo. 2. c. 28	Parliamentary Elections Act 1745	An Act for the better regulating of elections of members to serve in Parliament for such Cities and Towns in that Part of Great Britain called England as are Counties of themselves.	Section eleven.
20 Geo. 2. c. 43	Heritable Jurisdictions (Scotland) Act 1746	An Act the title of which begins with the words "An Act for taking" and ends with the words "more complete."	The title from "more" to "other."
20 Geo. 2. c. 51	Sales to the Crown Act 1746	An Act to enlarge the time limited by an Act of the last session of Parliament for restraining the use of the Highland Dress; and to enable Heirs of Taillies, Musicians, Tutors, Curators, and Trustees in Scotland to sell Lands to the Crown.	The title from "to enlarge" to "Dress; and."
21 Geo. 2. c. 19	Sheriffs (Scotland) Act 1747	An Act the title of which begins with the words "An Act for the more" and ends with the words "therein mentioned."	The title from "for the more" to "Scotland, and."
21 Geo. 2. c. 34	Cattle Theft (Scotland) Act 1747	An Act the title of which begins with the words "An Act to amend" and ends with the words "therein mentioned."	The title from "and restraining" to "Loyalty to His said late Majesty."
22 Geo. 2. c. 30	Settlement of Moravians in America Act 1748	An Act for encouraging the People known by the name of Unitas Fratrum, or United Brethren, to settle in His Majesty's Colonies in America.	The whole act.
23 Geo. 2. c. 22	National Debt (No. 2) Act 1749	An Act the title of which begins with the words "An Act for giving" and ends with the words "transferable Annuities."	The title from "and for impowering" to end of title.
24 Geo. 2. c. 4	Bank of England Act 1750	An Act the title of which begins with the words "An Act for enabling" and ends with the words "of Parliament."	The title from "for enabling His" to "fifty-one; and," and from "and for giving" to end of title.
24 Geo. 2. c. 40	Sale of Spirits Act 1750	An Act the title of which begins with the words "An Act for granting" and ends with the words "of Scotland."	The title from "for granting" to "retailing Spirituous Liquors; and," and from "and for allowing" to end of title.
25 Geo. 2. c. 4	Middlesex (Registry of Deeds) Act 1751	An Act the title of which begins with the words "An Act for appointing" and ends with the words "chief clerk."	Section three.
27 Geo. 2. c. 16	Justices' Clerks' Fees (Middlesex) Act 1754	An Act the title of which begins with the words "An Act for making" and ends with the words "such Carriages."	The title from "for making" to "Parliament; and," and from "and for giving" to end of title.
28 Geo. 2. c. 6	Mortuaries (Chester) Act 1755	An Act the title of which begins with the words "An Act for taking" and ends with the words "his Son."	Section seven.
31 Geo. 2. c. 11	Apprentices (Settlement) Act 1757	An Act the title of which begins with the words "An Act to amend" and ends with the words "than a Year."	The title from "and also" to end of title.
31 Geo. 2. c. 22	Pension Duties Act 1757	An Act the title of which begins with the words "An Act for Duties" and ends with the words "and Duties."	The title from "and upon Houses" to end of title.
31 Geo. 2. c. 32	Plate (Duty on Dealer's Licence) Act 1757	An Act the title of which begins with the words "An Act for repealing" and ends with the words "Silver Plate."	The title from "and for granting" to "dealing in Gold and Silver Plate," and from "and more effectually" to end of title.
32 Geo. 2. c. 54	Dewsbury to Elland Road Act 1758	An Act the title of which begins with the words "An Act to amend" and ends with the words "or Silver."	The title from "and for granting" to end of title.
4 Geo. 3. c. 31	Indemnity Act 1763	An Act the title of which begins with the words "An Act to indemnify" and ends with the words "and Chases."	The whole act.
5 Geo. 3. c. 17	Ecclesiastical Leases Act 1765	An Act the title of which begins with the words "An Act to confirm" and ends with the words "or Lives."	Section four.
5 Geo. 3. c. 26	Isle of Man Purchase Act 1765	An Act the title of which begins with the words "An Act for carrying" and ends with the words "particularly mentioned."	Section five.
5 Geo. 3. c. 51	Cloth Manufacture, Yorkshire Act 1765	An Act the title of which begins with the words "An Act for repealing" and ends with the words "Foreign Market."	Section thirty-one.
6 Geo. 3. c. 33	Cloth Manufacture, Yorkshire Act 1766	An Act the title of which begins with the words "An Act to amend" and ends with the words "Practice thereof."	Section twenty-sixth from "And also" to end of section.
7 Geo. 3. c. 38	Engraving Copyright Act 1766	An Act the title of which begins with the words "An Act to amend" and ends with the words "certain Ports."	The title from "and for vesting" to end of title.
7 Geo. 3. c. 48	Public Companies Act 1767	An Act for regulating the Proceedings of certain Public Companies and Corporations carrying on Trade or Dealings with Joint Stock, authorized by Act of Parliament; and for further regulating the Qualification of Members for voting in their respective General Courts.	Section four.
7 Geo. 3. c. 49	East India Company Act 1767	An Act for regulating certain Proceedings of the General Court of the East India Company, and of the Courts of Directors of the said Company.	The whole act.
9 Geo. 3. c. 29	Malicious Injury Act 1769	An Act the title of which begins with the words "An Act for the more effectual" and ends with the words "of Parliament."	The whole act.
9 Geo. 3. c. 37	Poor Relief Act 1769	An Act the title of which begins with the words "An Act for reviving" and ends with the words "therein mentioned."	The title from "for reviving" to "Consumption; and."
10 Geo. 3. c. 44	False Weights and Scales Act 1770	An Act the title of which begins with the words "An Act for more" and ends with the words "and Chairs."	The title from "and for explaining" to end of title.
10 Geo. 3. c. 47	East India Company Act 1770	An Act for naturalizing Foreign Protestants employed in the Service of the East India Company, and for other purposes therein mentioned.	The whole act.
12 Geo. 3. c. 21	Municipal Corporations (Mandamus) Act 1772	An Act for giving relief in Proceedings upon Writs of Mandamus for the Admission of Freemen into Corporations; and for other purposes therein mentioned.	The whole act.
12 Geo. 3. c. 72	Bills of Exchange (Scotland) Act 1772	An Act the title of which begins with the words "An Act for rendering" and ends with the words "called Scotland."	The title from "for rendering" to "Peinding and."
13 Geo. 3. c. 52	Plate Assay (Sheffield and Birmingham) Act 1772	An Act for assaying, marking, and stamping, Wrought Plate in the Towns of Sheffield and Birmingham.	Section thirty-one.
13 Geo. 3. c. 54	Game (Scotland) Act 1772	An Act for the more effectual Preservation of the Game in that part of Great Britain called Scotland; and for repealing and amending several of the Laws now in being relative thereto.	Section fifteen.
13 Geo. 3. c. 63	East India Company Act 1772	An Act for establishing certain Rules and Orders for the future Management of the Affairs of the East India Company as well in India as in Europe.	Preamble; sections one to six, eleven, twenty to twenty-two, thirty, thirty-one, thirty-four, thirty-five, and forty-seven.
13 Geo. 3. c. 82	Lying-in Hospitals Act 1773	An Act the title of which begins with the words "An Act for that" and ends with the words "and places."	Section nineteen.
14 Geo. 3. c. 78	Fires Prevention (Metropolis) Act 1774	An Act the title of which begins with the words "An Act for the further" and ends with the words "contrary to law."	The title from "for the further," to "party was mad," and from "and" to end of title.
15 Geo. 3. c. 53	Copyright Act 1775	An Act the title of which begins with the words "An Act" and ends with the words "therein mentioned."	Section eight.
18 Geo. 3. c. 12	Taxation of Colonies Act 1778	An Act the title of which begins with the words "An Act" and ends with the words "relates thereto."	The title from "and for repealing" to end of title.
18 Geo. 3. c. 19	Payment of Charges of Constables Act 1778	An Act the title of which begins with the words "An Act for the" and ends with the words "other Felony."	The whole act.
19 Geo. 3. c. 20	Ministers' Widows Fund (Scotland) Act 1779	An Act the title of which begins with the words "An Act for the better" and ends with the words "those purposes."	Section eighty-seven.
21 Geo. 3. c. 14	Lotteries (Ireland) Act 1780	An Act the title of which begins with the words "An Act for raising" and ends with the words "present Majesty."	The title from "and for consolidating" to end of title.
21 Geo. 3. c. 66	Clergy Residences Repair Act 1780	An Act the title of which begins with the words "An Act to explain," and ends with the words "their Benefits."	Section three.
24 Geo. 3. c. 20 (Note: 24 Geo. 3. Sess. 2. c. 20.)	Plate Assay (Sheffield) Act 1784	An Act the title of which begins with the words "An Act for altering," and ends with the words "of Sheffield."	Section five.
24 Geo. 3. c. 25 (Note: 24 Geo. 3. Sess. 2. c. 25.)	East India Company Act 1784	An Act the title of which begins with the words "An Act for the" and ends with the words "East Indies."	Sections eighty-four, eighty-five.
25 Geo. 3. c. 18	Newgate Gaol Delivery Act 1785	An Act the title of which begins with the words "An Act to empower," and ends with the words "of Middlesex."	Section two.
25 Geo. 3. c. 77	Fires Prevention Act 1785	An Act the title of which begins with the words "An Act to amend," and ends with the words "herein contained."	The title from "herein after" to end of title. Preamble and section one from the beginning of the section to "repealed and that," and from "of false Information," and from "at Westminster" to "allowed," and section six.
26 Geo. 3. c. 57	East India Company Act 1786	An Act the title of which begins with the words "An Act to indemnify further," and ends with the words "of India."	The title from "for repealing" to "respecting to the East Indies." Sections twenty-nine, thirty, thirty-nine.
26 Geo. 3. c. 62	East India Company (Money) Act 1786	An Act to enable the East India Company to raise Money by a Sale of Annuities, and by increasing their Capital Stock.	Sections four to nine.
26 Geo. 3. c. 77	Excise (No. 5) Act 1786	An Act the title of which begins with the words "An Act to limit," and ends with the words "of Excise."	The title from "to limit" to "Stamps, and."
28 Geo. 3. c. 7	Gold and Silver Thread Act 1788	An Act the title of which begins with the words "An Act to amend," and ends with the words "silver thread."	Section eight.
28 Geo. 3. c. 37	Excise Act 1788	An Act the title of which begins with the words "An Act for repealing," and ends with the words "or Silver."	The title from "for repealing" to "such sales," and from "and" to "prevent" to end of title.
29 Geo. 3. c. 41	Tontine Annuities Act 1789	An Act for raising a certain Sum of Money by way of Annuities to be attended with the Benefit of Survivorship in Classes.	From and after the death of the last surviving annuitant under the Act.
29 Geo. 3. c. 65	East India Company (Money) Act 1789	An Act to enable the East India Company to raise Money by further increasing their Capital Stock.	Sections three to seven.
30 Geo. 3. c. 31	Silver Plate Act 1790	An Act the title of which begins with the words "An Act to alter," and ends with the words "said Bank."	Section six.
30 Geo. 3. c. 45	Tontine Annuities Act 1790	An Act for converting certain Tontine Annuities into certain Annuities for an absolute Term of Years, and for enabling the Commissioners of the Treasury to nominate Lives for the Shares to be converted.	From and after the death of the last surviving annuitant under the Act.
32 Geo. 3. c. 58	Information in Nature of Quo Warranto Act 1792	An Act for the Amendment of the Law in Proceedings upon Information in nature of Quo Warranto.	The whole act.
32 Geo. 3. c. 63	Scottish Episcopalians Relief Act 1792	An Act for granting Relief to Pastors, Ministers, and Lay Persons of the Episcopal Communion in Scotland.	Section one.
33 Geo. 3. c. 47	East India Company (Money) Act 1793	An Act the title of which begins with the words "An Act for placing" and ends with the words "said Company."	Sections ten to thirteen and section sixteen.
33 Geo. 3. c. 52	East India Company Act 1793	An Act the title of which begins with the words "An Act for continuing" and ends with the words "in Scotland."	Preamble, and sections one to eighteen, twenty-one, twenty-three, twenty-six, twenty-eight to thirty-one, thirty-eight, forty-eight to fifty-nine, sixty-three, sixty-eight to seventy-five, seventy-seven to ninety-three, ninety-five to ninety-seven, one hundred and fifty-two to one hundred and fifty-eight, one hundred and fifty-eight to one hundred and sixty-two.
33 Geo. 3. c. 68	Wales, Chester, etc. (Courts) Act 1793	An Act for remedying certain Inconveniences attending certain proceedings in the Courts of Great Sessions in Wales and in the County Palatine of Chester, in the Court of Common Pleas for the County Palatine of Lancaster, and in the Court of Pleas for the County Palatine of Durham, and in the County Courts of Wales.	The whole act.
36 Geo. 3. c. 50	Wakefield Improvement Act 1796	An Act to regulate the making and vending of Steel Articles, and to prevent the Purchasers thereof from being deceived in the real Quality of such Rations.	Section twenty-two.
36 Geo. 3. c. 85	Mills Act 1796	An Act for the better Regulation of Mills.	Section eleven.
37 Geo. 3. c. 35	Militia (Tower Hamlets) Act 1796	An Act for examining paging and ordering the Militia Forces of the Tower Hamlets, in the County of Middlesex.	Section eight.
38 Geo. 3. c. 48	Land Tax Commissioners Act 1798	An Act the title of which begins with the words "An Act" and ends with the words "of Commissioners."	Section four.
39 Geo. 3. c. 73	Legacy Duty Act 1799	An Act the title of which begins with the words "An Act for exempting," and ends with the words "British Museum."	The title from "and also" to end of title.
39 Geo. 3. c. 79	Unlawful Societies Act 1799	An Act the title of which begins with the words "An Act for the more," and ends with the words "auditions practices."	Section thirty-eight from "convictions" to "against this Act and," and form L. in Schedule.
39 & 40 Geo. 3. c. 28	Bank of England Act 1800	An Act the title of which begins with the words "An Act to continue," and ends with the words "one hundred."	Section seventeen.
39 & 40 Geo. 3. c. 81	Hop Trade Act 1800	An Act the title of which begins with the words "An Act to repeal" and ends with the words "of Hops."	The title from "to repeal" to "duty on Hops; and."
39 & 40 Geo. 3. c. 109	Exchequer Bills Act 1800	An Act the title of which begins with the words "An Act for granting" and ends with the words "otherwise destroyed."	The title from "otherwise destroyed" to "Parliament; and."
41 Geo. 3. (U.K.) c. 24	Compensation for Injuries to Mills, etc. Act 1801	An Act for the indemnifying of Persons injured by the forcible pulling down and demolishing of Mills, or the demolishing of property belonging, by Persons unlawfully and riotously assembled.	The whole act.
41 Geo. 3. (U.K.) c. 79	Public Notaries Act 1801	An Act for the better Regulation of Public Notaries in England.	Section eighteen.
41 Geo. 3. (U.K.) c. 103	Malta Act 1801	An Act the title of which begins with the words "An Act to explain" and ends with the words "to throw."	The title from "to empower" to "Parliament; and."
42 Geo. 3. c. 67	Theft of Turnips, etc. Act 1802	An Act the title of which begins with the words "An Act to extend" and ends with the words "the said Act."	The whole act.
43 Geo. 3. c. 29	Continuance of Laws Act 1803	An Act for remedying certain Defects in the Laws relative to the building and repairing of County Bridges, and other Works maintained at the Expense of the Inhabitants of Counties of England.	Section twenty-eight.
47 Geo. 3 Sess. 2. c. 69	India Government, etc. Act 1807	An Act the title of which begins with the words "An Act for the better" and ends with the words "Service Abroad."	Preamble and section eleven.
48 Geo. 3. c. 110	Herring Fishery (Scotland) Act 1808	An Act the title of which begins with the words "An Act for the further" and ends with the words "of Parliament."	Sections five, seven, nine, in section eleven the words "the secretary and" wherever they occur, and section fifty-six.
48 Geo. 3. c. 140	Dublin Police Magistrates Act 1808	An Act for the more effectual Administration of the Office of a Justice of the Peace, and for the more effectual Prevention of Felonies within the District of Dublin Metropolis.	Section one hundred and twenty-seven.
51 Geo. 3. c. 41	Stealing of Linen, etc. Act 1811	An Act the title of which begins with the words "An Act to repeal" and ends with the words "such felonies."	Preamble.
51 Geo. 3. c. 64	East India Company Bonds Act 1811	An Act the title of which begins with the words "An Act to enable" and ends with the words "relative thereto."	Preamble and section five.
52 Geo. 3. c. 63	Embezzlement by Bankers, etc. Act 1812	An Act the title of which begins with the words "An Act for more effectually," and ends with the words "other Agents."	Section nineteen.
52 Geo. 3. c. 155	Places of Religious Worship Act 1812	An Act relating to Religious Worship and Assemblies, and Persons teaching or preaching therein.	Section nineteen.
53 Geo. 3. c. 127	Ecclesiastical Courts Act 1813	An Act for the better Regulation of Ecclesiastical Courts in England and for the more easy Recovery of Church Rates and Tithes.	Sections four, five, six, except as to tithes offerings and compositions which have not been commuted or are otherwise still payable.
55 Geo. 3. c. 84	Indian Presidency Towns Act 1815	An Act the title of which begins with the words "An Act to extend" and ends with the words "certain cases."	The whole act.
55 Geo. 3. c. 94	Herring Fishery (Scotland) Act 1815	An Act to continue and amend several Acts relating to the British White Herring Fishery.	Sections two to four.
55 Geo. 3. c. 194	Apothecaries Act 1815	An Act for better regulating the Practice of Apothecaries throughout England and Wales.	Section thirty-one.
56 Geo. 3. c. 104	Excise (No. 2) Act 1816	An Act the title of which begins with the words "An Act for the" and ends with the words "of judgment."	The title from "the making" to "fishery; and."
57 Geo. 3. c. 19	Seditious Meetings Act 1817	An Act for the more effectually preventing Seditious Meetings and Assemblies.	Section thirty-four from "convictions" to "against this Act and," and forms I. and III. in Schedule.
58 Geo. 3. c. 69	Vestries Act 1818	An Act for the Regulation of Parish Vestries.	Section seven from "and that" to end of section.
59 Geo. 3. c. 96	Felonies on Stage Coaches Act 1819	An Act to facilitate the Trials of Felonies committed on Stage Coaches and Stage Waggons, and other such Carriages; and of Felonies committed on the Boundaries of Counties.	The whole act.
1 Geo. 4. c. 100	Militia (City of London) Act 1820	An Act the title of which begins with the words "An Act for amending" and ends with the words "of London."	Section eight.
1 & 2 Geo. 4. c. 36	Public Notaries (Ireland) Act 1821	An Act for the better Regulation of the Public Notaries in Ireland.	Section eighteen.
1 & 2 Geo. 4. c. 79	White Herring Fishery (Scotland) Act 1821	An Act to repeal certain Bounties granted for the Encouragement of the Deep Sea British White Herring Fishery, and to make further Regulations relating thereto.	Section nine.
1 & 2 Geo. 4. c. 88	Rescue Act 1821	An Act for the Amendment of the Law of Rescue.	Section three.
3 Geo. 4. c. 33	Riotous Assemblies (Scotland) Act 1822	An Act the title of which begins with the words "An Act for altering" and ends with the words "malicious offenders."	Preamble.
3 Geo. 4. c. 116	Registry of Deeds (Ireland) Act 1822	An Act for the more convenient and effectual registering Ireland Deeds executed in Great Britain.	Section eight.

== See also ==
- Statute Law Revision Act
