= Quare =

Quare could refer to the following:

- The Quare Fellow, a Brendan Behan play produced in 1954
- quare impedit English law writ commencing an advowson
- Daniel Quare (died 1724), an English clockmaker

Quare is also used in conversation in parts of Ireland, where it is used to mean something out of the ordinary (or "queer").
