= Quare impedit =

Writ in English law

In English law, quare impedit was a writ commencing a common law action for deciding a disputed right of presentation to a benefice, a right known as an advowson. It was typically brought by a patron against a bishop who refuses to appoint the patron's nominee as a priest.

It obtained its name from the words of the ancient writ that started the proceeding until the 19th century. This writ was directed to the sheriff, instructing him to command the defendant to permit the plaintiff to present an appropriate candidate, or else to show "why he hinders" (Latin: quare impedit) the plaintiff in the exercise of his rights. The writ of quare impedit was one of the few real actions preserved by the Real Property Limitation Act 1833, and survived up to 1860. It was abolished by the Common Law Procedure Act 1860, and proceedings in quare impedit were changed to make them as similar as possible to those in other real actions.

The defendant bishop would need to fully state upon the pleadings the grounds on which he refuses. Quare impedit was a remedy exclusively of a patron; a nominee's remedy was by the proceeding called duplex querela available only in the ecclesiastical court. The action would not be barred till the expiration of sixty years, or of three successive incumbencies adverse to the plaintiff's right, whichever period was the longer (Real Property Limitation Act 1833, 29).

Where the patron of a benefice was a Roman Catholic, one of the universities would present in his place (Clergy (Ireland) Act 1688 in 1689, 1 Will. & Mar. Sess. 1. c. 29). By Presentation of Benefices Act 1713 (13 Ann. c. 13 (1714)), during the pendency of a quare impedit to which either of the universities was a party, the court had power to administer an oath for the discovery of any secret trust, and to order the cestui que trust to repeat and subscribe a declaration against transubstantiation. In Scotland, the effect of a quare impedit could be attained by action of declarator. In the United States, owing to the difference of ecclesiastical organization, the action was never known.
