= The Banks o' Doon =

1791 Scots song written by Robert Burns

"The Banks o' Doon" is a Scots poem, turned into a song written by Robert Burns in 1791, sometimes known as "Ye Banks and Braes" (after the opening line of the third version). Burns set the lyrics to an air called The Caledonian Hunt's Delight. Its melodic schema was also used for Phule Phule Dhole Dhole, a song by Bengali poet Rabindranath Tagore.

The song was inspired by the story of Margaret (Peggy) Kennedy (1766–1795), who was seduced and then abandoned by Andrew McDouall, the son of a wealthy family and sometime Member of Parliament for Wigtownshire. Kennedy sued for a declarator of marriage, but died prior to adjudication of the case. Although the Consistorial court found the marriage claim valid, the Court of Session decided the marriage claim failed, but found McDouall to be the father of Kennedy's daughter and ordered that he pay £3,000 to Kennedy's estate and provide for the child. (Burns wrote a second poem about Peggy, whom he had met when she was 18 - Young Peggy Blooms.)

The song uses the same tune as the East Anglian variant of the English Folk song "Foggy Dew".

== Lyrics ==
Burns wrote three versions of the song, all published in 1791.

First Version	Second Version	Third Version
Sweet are the banks — the banks o' Doon, The spreading flowers are fair, And everything is blythe and glad, But I am fu' o' care.	Ye flowery banks o' bonie Doon, How can ye bloom sae fair; How can ye chant, ye little birds, And I sae fu' o' care!	Ye banks and braes o' bonie Doon, How can ye bloom sae fresh and fair; How can ye chant, ye little birds, And I sae weary, fu' o' care!
Thou'll break my heart, thou bonie bird, That sings upon the bough; Thou minds me o' the happy days When my fause Luve was true:	Thou'll break my heart, thou bonie bird, That sings upon the bough! Thou minds me o' the happy days When my fause Luve was true.	Thou'll break my heart, thou warbling bird, That wantons thro' the flowering thorn: Thou minds me o' departed joys, Departed never to return.
Thou'll break my heart, thou bonie bird, That sings beside thy mate; For sae I sat, and sae I sang, And wist na o' my fate.	Thou'll break my heart, thou bonie bird, That sings beside thy mate; For sae I sat, and sae I sang, And wist na o' my fate.	
Aft hae I rov'd by bonie Doon, To see the woodbine twine; And ilka birds sang o' its Luve, And sae did I o' mine:	Aft hae I rov'd by bonie Doon, To see the woodbine twine; And ilka bird sang o' its Luve, And sae did I o' mine.	Aft hae I rov'd by Bonie Doon, To see the rose and woodbine twine: And ilka bird sang o' its Luve, And fondly sae did I o' mine;.
Wi' lightsome heart I pu'd a rose, Upon its thorny tree; But my fause Luver staw my rose And left the thorn wi' me:	Wi' lightsome heart I pu'd a rose, Upon its thorny tree; But my fause Luver staw my rose, And left the thorn wi' me.	Wi' lightsome heart I pu'd a rose, Fu' sweet upon its thorny tree! And my fause Luver staw my rose, But ah! She left the thorn wi' me.
Wi' lightsome heart I pu'd a rose, Upon a morn in June; And sae I flourished on the morn, And sae was pu'd or noon!	Wi' lightsome heart I pu'd a rose, Upon a morn in June; And sae I flourished on the morn, And sae was pu'd or noon.	
