= Prison Security Act 1992 =

- Act of Parliament
- Parliament of the United Kingdom
- Long title: An Act to make provision for an offence of prison mutiny and for a new offence and new penalties in connection with escapes from prison.
- Citation: 1992 c. 25
- Territorial extent: England and Wales

Dates
- Royal assent: 16 March 1992
- Commencement: 16 May 1992

Status: Current legislation

Text of statute as originally enacted

Text of the Prison Security Act 1992 as in force today (including any amendments) within the United Kingdom, from legislation.gov.uk.

The Prison Security Act 1992 (c. 25) is an act of the Parliament of the United Kingdom.

== Section 1 - Offence of prison mutiny ==
This section reads:

(1) Any prisoner who takes part in a prison mutiny shall be guilty of an offence and liable, on conviction on indictment, to imprisonment for a term not exceeding ten years or to a fine or to both.

(2) For the purposes of this section there is a prison mutiny where two or more prisoners, while on the premises of any prison, engage in conduct which is intended to further a common purpose of overthrowing lawful authority in that prison.
(3) For the purposes of this section the intentions and common purpose of prisoners may be inferred from the form and circumstances of their conduct and it shall be immaterial that conduct falling within subsection (2) above takes a different form in the case of different prisoners.
(4) Where there is a prison mutiny, a prisoner who has or is given a reasonable opportunity of submitting to lawful authority and fails, without reasonable excuse, to do so shall be regarded for the purposes of this section as taking part in the mutiny.
(5) Proceedings for an offence under this section shall not be brought except by or with the consent of the Director of Public Prosecutions.
(6) In this section-

"conduct" includes acts and omissions;
"prison" means any prison, young offender institution or remand centre which is under the general superintendence of, or is provided by, the Secretary of State under the Prison Act 1952, including a contracted out prison within the meaning of Part IV of the Criminal Justice Act 1991;
"prisoner" means any person for the time being in a prison as a result of any requirement imposed by a court or otherwise that he be detained in legal custody.

Section 1(6) is prospectively amended by sections 74 and 80 of, and paragraph 115 of Schedule 7 to, the Criminal Justice and Court Services Act 2000.

Kenneth Baker said that section 1 was "intentionally quite strict"

As to sentencing, see R v Ali [1998] 2 Cr App R (S) 123, CA.

See also Crown Prosecution Service guidance on prison mutiny.

== Section 2 - Offences relating to escape ==
Section 2(1) amends section 39 of the Prison Act 1952.

Section 2(2) amends section 22(2)(b) of the Criminal Justice Act 1961.

Section 2(3) repealed section 22(1) of, and the entry relating to section 39 of the Prison Act 1952 in schedule 4 to, the Criminal Justice Act 1961.

== Section 3 - Short title, commencement and extent ==
Section 3(2) provides that the act came into force at the end of the period of two months that began on the date on which it was passed. The word "months" means calendar months. The day (that is to say, 16 March 1992) on which the Act was passed (that is to say, received royal assent) is included in the period of two months. This means that the act came into force on 16 May 1992.

== See also ==
- Prison Act
