= Sheriffs Act 1887 =

Act of the Parliament of the United Kingdom

Sheriffs Act 1887 (Note: Section 1.)
- Act of Parliament
- Parliament of the United Kingdom
- Long title: An Act to consolidate the Law relating to the office of Sheriff in England, and to repeal certain enactments relating to Sheriffs which have ceased to be in force or have become unnecessary.
- Citation: 50 & 51 Vict. c. 55
- Introduced by: Sir Edward Clarke MP (Commons); Hardinge Giffard, 1st Baron Halsbury (Lords)
- Territorial extent: England and Wales (Note: Section 2.)

Dates
- Royal assent: 16 September 1887
- Commencement: 16 September 1887 (Note: The Acts of Parliament (Commencement) Act 1793.)

Other legislation
- Amends: See § Repealed enactments
- Repeals/revokes: See § Repealed enactments
- Amended by: Statute Law Revision Act 1908; Representation of the People Act 1918; Representation of the People Act 1948; Cambridgeshire and Isle of Ely Order 1964; Criminal Law Act 1967; Theft Act 1968; Courts Act 1971; Local Government Act 1972; Statute Law (Repeals) Act 1973; Administration of Justice Act 1977; Statute Law (Repeals) Act 1978; Statute Law (Repeals) Act 1981; Statute Law (Repeals) Act 1993; Local Government (Wales) Act 1994; Local Government Changes for England (Miscellaneous Provision) Regulations 1995; Local Government Changes for England (Sheriffs) Order 1996; Local Government Changes for England (Lord-Lieutenants and Sheriffs) Order 1997; Statute Law (Repeals) Act 1998; Courts Act 2003; Constitutional Reform Act 2005; Tribunals, Courts and Enforcement Act 2007; Local Government (Structural Changes) (Miscellaneous Amendments and Other Provision) Order 2009; Local Government (Structural and Boundary Changes) (Supplementary Provision and Miscellaneous Amendments) Order 2019; Northamptonshire (Structural Changes) (Supplementary Provision and Amendment) Order 2021; Cumbria (Structural Changes) Order 2022
- Relates to: Repeal of Obsolete Statutes Act 1856; Coroners Act 1887

Status: Amended

History of passage through Parliament

Records of Parliamentary debate relating to the statute from Hansard

Text of statute as originally enacted

Revised text of statute as amended

Text of the Sheriffs Act 1887 as in force today (including any amendments) within the United Kingdom, from legislation.gov.uk.

The Sheriffs Act 1887 (50 & 51 Vict. c. 55) is an act of the Parliament of the United Kingdom that consolidated for England and Wales enactments relating to sheriffs and repealed from 1275 to 1881 which had ceased to be in force or had become unnecessary. The act was intended, in particular, to facilitate the preparation of the revised edition of the statutes, then in progress. The act also gave sheriffs the right to arrest those resisting a warrant (posse comitatus).

== Background ==
In the United Kingdom, acts of Parliament remain in force until expressly repealed. Blackstone's Commentaries on the Laws of England, published in the late 18th-century, raised questions about the system and structure of the common law and the poor drafting and disorder of the existing statute book.

From 1810 to 1825, The Statutes of the Realm was published, providing the first authoritative collection of acts. The first statute law revision act was not passed until 1856 with the Repeal of Obsolete Statutes Act 1856 (19 & 20 Vict. c. 64). This approach — focusing on removing obsolete laws from the statute book followed by consolidation — was proposed by Peter Locke King MP, who had been highly critical of previous commissions' approaches, expenditures, and lack of results.

Previous statute law revision acts
Year passed	Title	Citation	Effect
1861	Statute Law Revision Act 1861	24 & 25 Vict. c. 101	Repealed or amended over 800 enactments
1863	Statute Law Revision Act 1863	26 & 27 Vict. c. 125	Repealed or amended over 1,600 enactments for England and Wales
1867	Statute Law Revision Act 1867	30 & 31 Vict. c. 59	Repealed or amended over 1,380 enactments
1870	Statute Law Revision Act 1870	33 & 34 Vict. c. 69	Repealed or amended over 250 enactments
1871	Promissory Oaths Act 1871	34 & 35 Vict. c. 48	Repealed or amended almost 200 enactments
1871	Statute Law Revision Act 1871	34 & 35 Vict. c. 116	Repealed or amended over 1,060 enactments
1872	Statute Law Revision Act 1872	35 & 36 Vict. c. 63	Repealed or amended almost 490 enactments
1872	Statute Law (Ireland) Revision Act 1872	35 & 36 Vict. c. 98	Repealed or amended over 1,050 enactments
1872	Statute Law Revision Act 1872 (No. 2)	35 & 36 Vict. c. 97	Repealed or amended almost 260 enactments
1873	Statute Law Revision Act 1873	36 & 37 Vict. c. 91	Repealed or amended 1,225 enactments
1874	Statute Law Revision Act 1874	37 & 38 Vict. c. 35	Repealed or amended over 490 enactments
1874	Statute Law Revision Act 1874 (No. 2)	37 & 38 Vict. c. 96	Repealed or amended almost 470 enactments
1875	Statute Law Revision Act 1875	38 & 39 Vict. c. 66	Repealed or amended over 1,400 enactments
1876	Statute Law Revision (Substituted Enactments) Act 1876	39 & 40 Vict. c. 20	Updated references to repealed acts
1878	Statute Law Revision (Ireland) Act 1878	41 & 42 Vict. c. 57	Repealed or amended over 460 enactments passed by the Parliament of Ireland
1878	Statute Law Revision Act 1878	41 & 42 Vict. c. 79	Repealed or amended over 90 enactments.
1879	Statute Law Revision (Ireland) Act 1879	42 & 43 Vict. c. 24	Repealed or amended over 460 enactments passed by the Parliament of Ireland
1879	Civil Procedure Acts Repeal Act 1879	42 & 43 Vict. c. 59	Repealed or amended over 130 enactments
1881	Statute Law Revision and Civil Procedure Act 1881	44 & 45 Vict. c. 59	Repealed or amended or amended almost 100 enactments relating to civil procedure.
1883	Statute Law Revision Act 1883	46 & 47 Vict. c. 39	Repealed or amended over 475 enactments
1883	Statute Law Revision and Civil Procedure Act 1883	46 & 47 Vict. c. 49	Repealed or amended over 475 enactments
1887	Statute Law Revision Act 1887	50 & 51 Vict. c. 59	Repealed or amended over 200 enactments

== Passage ==
The Sheriffs (Consolidation) Bill had its first reading in the House of Lords on 22 March 1887, introduced by the Lord Chancellor, Hardinge Giffard, 1st Baron Halsbury. The bill had its second reading in the House of Lords on 31 March 1887 and was committed to a committee of the whole house, which met and reported on 1 April 1887, without amendments. The bill had its third reading in the House of Lords on 18 April 1887 and passed, without amendments.

The bill had its first reading in the House of Commons on 10 May 1887. The bill had its second reading in the House of Commons on 12 July 1887, introduced by the Solicitor General, Sir Edward Clarke MP. During debate, the bill was criticised for leaving out the consolidation of statutes relating to sheriffs in Ireland. The bill was committed to a committee of the whole house, which was delayed several times, receiving criticism from MPs. The committee which met on 5 September 1887 and 10 September 1887, during which the bill received further criticism "subverting" the customs of the House by the High Sheriff of Dublin City, Thomas Sexton MP. The committee reported on 10 September 1887, with amendments. The bill had its third reading in the House of Commons on 10 September 1887 and passed, with amendments.

The amended bill was considered and agreed to by the House of Lords on 13 September 1887.

The bill was granted royal assent on 16 September 1887.

== Subsequent developments ==
Several acts repealed by this act were repealed again by the Statute Law Revision Act 1887 (50 & 51 Vict. c. 59), which was passed simultaneously. The territorial terms of the act led to several acts being for the avoidance of doubt for Ireland repealed by other Statute Law Revision Acts, including the Statute Law Revision (Ireland) Act 1872 (35 & 36 Vict. c. 98).

The act was intended, in particular, to facilitate the preparation of a revised edition of the statutes.

Part of section 39 and the third schedule to the act were repealed by section 1 of, and the schedule to, the Statute Law Revision Act 1908 (8 Edw. 7. c. 49)), which came into force on 21 December 1908.

In section 3(3) of the act, the words " of the Crown, or in Cornwall " were repealed by section 1(1) of, and part I of schedule 1 to, the Statute Law (Repeals) Act 1973, which came into force on 18 July 1973.

Section 14 of the act was repealed by section 1(1) of, and group 1 of part I of schedule 1 to, the Statute Law (Repeals) Act 1993, which came into force on 5 November 1993.

== Repealed enactments ==
Section 39 of the act repealed 73 enactments, listed in the third schedule to the act.

Section 39 of the act included several safeguards to ensure that the repeal does not negatively affect existing rights or ongoing legal matters, including:

1. Any rights acquired or obligations incurred under previously repealed enactments
2. Existing borough and city charter rights
3. Common law powers and rights
4. Prior legal proceedings and penalties
5. The status of current office holders like sheriffs and bailiffs
6. The validity of existing writs and orders
7. Fees or poundage taken

Section 40 of the act provided that notwithstanding any repeal, courts leet, court baron or other like courts existing at the time shall continue to be held on the same days and in their usual places as before, but without larger powers or fees, and any indictment or presentment shall be dealt with as previously. Section 40 of the act also provided that officers like coroners and escheators shall continue to be governed by previous rules unless specifically substituted by new provisions in this act.

Citation	Short title	Title	Extent of repeal
3 Edw. 1 (Stat. Westm. prim.) c. 9	Pursuit of felons	Pursuit of felons. Punishment for neglect or corruption in officers.	The whole chapter, except so far as the sheriff, "sous sheriffs," the chapter, so far as it concerns bailiffs of sheriffs, and the whole chapter so far as is it not already repealed.
3 Edw. 1. (Stat. Westm. prim.) c. 15	Prisoners and Bail Act 1275	Prisoners and bail. Offenders bailable and not bailable. Penalty for unlawful mainprize. Penalty for unjust detention of prisoners.	The whole chapter so far as it relates to a sheriff or any officer of a sheriff.
3 Edw. 1.(Stat. Westm. prim.) c. 26	Extortion by officers of the Crown	Extortion by the King's officers.	The whole chapter so far as relates to sheriffs and bailiffs of counties.
12 Edw. 1. (Statuta Wallie) c. 2	Statuta Wallie	Regulation of the jurisdiction and its division into counties. The sheriffs and other officers appointed.	The whole chapter. (Note: The whole act was repealed by the Statute Law Revision Act 1887 (50 & 51 Vict. c. 59).)
12 Edw. 1. (Statuta Wallie) c. 3	Statuta Wallie	Of the office of sheriff in Wales, and the manner of holding courts.	The whole chapter. (Note: The whole act was repealed by the Statute Law Revision Act 1887 (50 & 51 Vict. c. 59).)
12 Edw. 1. (Statuta Wallie) c. 4	Statuta Wallie	The tourn. Articles to be inquired of. Franchises, &c. usurped. Presentments of the jury. For capital offences. For smaller offences. How the sheriff shall proceed on presentments.	The whole chapter. (Note: The whole act was repealed by the Statute Law Revision Act 1887 (50 & 51 Vict. c. 59).)
12 Edw. 1. (Stat. Roth.)	Provisiones facete in Scaccario	Provisions made in the Exchequer.	The whole statute.
13 Edw. 1. (Stat. Westm. Sec.) c. 13	Sheriff's tourn, etc.	Sheriff's imprisoning others for felony, &c. without an inquest made shall be liable to action for false imprisonment.	The whole chapter.
13 Edw. 1. (Stat. Westm. Sec.) c. 13	Execution of Process Act 1285	How writs shall be delivered to the sheriffs to be executed. Issue for false return of writs. The like for false returns. The like where a liberty is returned. The like for sheriff's false return or denial shall be accounted issues. Resistance of process. Punishment thereof.	The whole chapter.
25 Edw. 1. (Magna Carta) c. 17	Pleas of the Crown	Pleas of the Crown.	So far as it relates to any sheriff or officer or his bailiff.
25 Edw. 1. (Magna Carta) c. 35	Frankpledge: sheriff's tourn	County court. Sheriff's tourn. View of Frankpledge.	The whole chapter.
28 Edw. 1. (Artic. Sup. Cart.) c. 13	Election of sheriffs	Of the persons to be chosen coroners.	The whole chapter.
9 Edw. 2. st. 2 (Stat. Lincoln)	Statutum Lincoln' de Vicecomitibȝ	The statute of sheriffs.	The whole statute.
Stat. Temp. Incert. (Visus Franciplegii)	Visus Franciplegii	The view of Frankpledge.	The whole statute.
1 Edw. 3. st. 2. c. 17	Indictments	Indictment shall be taken by indenture.	The whole chapter.
2 Edw. 3. c. 4	Sheriff	The statute of Lincoln, 9 Edw. 2. concerning sheriffs.	The whole chapter.
2 Edw. 3. c. 5	Sheriff	The statute of Westminster, the second, 13 Edw. 1. c. 39. concerning the delivery of writs to the sheriff armed.	The whole chapter.
2 Edw. 3. c. 12	Annexing Hundreds to Counties	Hundreds and wapentakes shall be annexed to counties and not let to ferm.	The whole chapter.
5 Edw. 3. c. 4	Qualification of sheriffs	Sheriffs, &c. shall have sufficient in the county.	The whole chapter.
14 Edw. 3. st. 1. c. 7	Appointment of sheriffs	Sheriffs shall be appointed annually by the Exchequer.	The whole chapter.
14 Edw. 3. c. 9	Annexing hundreds to counties	Hundreds and wapentakes to be rejoined to the respective counties; and the ferm at the ancient rent limited. Only one bailiff errant in one county. Bailiwicks in fee. Who shall punish offenders. Punishment of lords of hundreds offending.	The whole chapter.
28 Edw. 3. c. 7	Sheriffs	Sheriffs shall be removed from office yearly.	The whole chapter.
28 Edw. 3. c. 9	Sheriffs	Commission to sheriffs for taking inquests to indict people repealed. Process inhibited.	The whole chapter.
31 Edw. 3. c. 15	Sheriff's tourn	The sheriff's tourn shall be held within the month after Easter and Michaelmas.	The whole chapter.
1 Ric. 2. c. 11	Sheriffs (re-appointment)	No sheriff shall be re-elected within three years.	The whole chapter.
23 Hen. 6. c. 7	Sheriffs (Tenure of Office)	Recital of the statutes against the continuance of sheriffs in their office, viz., 14 Edw. 3. st. 1. c. 7; 42 Edw. 3. c. 9; 1 Ric. 2. c. 11. The said statutes confirmed: Exceptions. London, &c. Penalty for occupying the office of sheriff above one year 200l. per annum. All pardons and patents made to the contrary void. Action for the penalty.	The whole chapter.
23 Hen. 6. c. 9	Sheriffs and Bailiffs, Fees, etc. Act 1444	No sheriff shall let his county, &c. to ferm. No sheriffs' officers shall be attorneys. Surety to be returned upon inquests. Such officers shall not take anything of persons arrested for ease and favour, &c. Fees to persons arrested shall be paid by those who caused them to be arrested. No fee for returns or panels. Fee for a copy of a panel. Sheriffs, &c. shall let to bail persons arrested. On certain execution. How the bond shall be taken on such bailing. The conditions thereof. Bonds in other form void. Sheriff's officers shall make deputation in the King's court. Penalty on offending against this Act. Justices of assize, &c. may inquire of offenders. Sheriff's returning copias dedimus se shall be chargeable with the bodies. Exception for the warden of the fleet.	The whole chapter. (Note: This act was wholly repealed for Ireland by the Statute Law Revision (Ireland) Act 1872 (35 & 36 Vict. c. 98).)
1 Edw. 4. c. 2	Sheriff's Tourn Act 1461	Justices of peace in sessions shall try and determine indictments taken in sheriff's tourns.	The whole Act.
12 Edw. 4. c. 1	Sheriff (Execution of Writs, etc.) Act 1472	Recital of the statute 23 H. 6. c. 7. Sheriffs before having their writ of discharge may return writs during Michaelmas term.	The whole statute.
17 Edw. 4. c. 7	Sheriffs (Execution of Writs, etc.) Act 1477	Recital of st. 12 Edw. 4. c. 1. as to returns of writs by sheriffs. Act that the then sheriff may return writs and otherwise execute his office during Michaelmas and Hilary term if not discharged.	The whole chapter.
11 Hen. 7. c. 15	Sheriff's County Court Act 1495	An Act against sheriffs and under-sheriffs.	The whole Act.
19 Hen. 7. c. 24	Sussex Sheriff's County Court Act 1503	The shire court for Sussex shall be holden at Chichester and Lewes, alternately.	The whole Act.
21 Hen. 8. c. 20	President of the Council Act 1529	An Act that the Judges of the Kynges Counsaile shal associate with the Chauncellor and Treasurer of England and the Keper of the Kinges Privie Seale.	Section two so far as relates to the naming of sheriffs.
27 Hen. 8. c. 5	Justice of the Peace (Chester and Wales) Act 1535	An Acte for makynge of justices of peace in Wales.	Section two, from "of Chester and Flint" down to "county of Glamorgan," the words "at and from "and that every sheriff of every of the said shires," to the end of the section, and so much of section four as relates to a sheriff, his deputy or ministers.
27 Hen. 8. c. 24	Jurisdiction in Liberties Act 1535	An Acte for re-contynuyng of certayne liberties and franchises heretofore taken from the Crowne.	Section six, section seven, section eight, section twelve, and section thirteen.
27 Hen. 8. c. 26	Laws in Wales Act 1535	An Acte for Lawes and Justice to be ministred in Wales in like fourme as it is in this Realme.	Section two, from "attachments" to the end of the section. Section three, from "and cause" to the end of the section, except so far as relates to escheatours and coroners. Section four, from "and that the shire courts" to the end of the section. Section five, from "and that the shire courts" to the end of the section. Section six, from "and that sessions" to the end of the section. Section seven, from "and that the counties or shire courts" to the end of the section. Section eight, from "and that justice shall be ministered, used, exercised" to the end of the section. Section seventeen, so far as it relates to sheriffs or their deputies in the sheriffs courts; and Section eighteen, down to "justices of the peace of the said county of Monmouth," and from "and that every of the sheriffs of the said counties" down to "there before the same justices" the words "as well by the said sheriffs as".
33 Hen. 8. c. 13	Lordships of Wales Act 1541	An Acte concerninge certain Lordshippes translatede from the countie of Denbigh to the countye of Flynt shire.	Section one.
34 & 35 Hen. 8. c. 26	Laws in Wales Act 1542	An Acte for certain ordinances in the Kinges Majestys dominion and principalitie of Wales.	Section ten, section twenty, from "which sheriff" to end of section; section twenty-one, section twenty-six, from "that everie of the saide shirifes" to the end of section twenty-seven, section twenty-eight, section twenty-nine, section thirty, and section thirty-one.
1 Edw. 6. c. 10	Exigents, etc. in Wales and Cheshire Act 1547	An Acte for wryghts and proclamacions in Wales and in the countie palatyne of Chester, Lancast' and also in the citie of Chester.	The whole Act except so much of sections one and three as relates to coroners other than civil cases.
2 & 3 Edw. 6. c. 25	Sheriff's County Court Act 1548	An Acte for the keppinge of countie daies.	The whole Act.
5 & 6 Edw. 6. c. 26	Proclamations and Exigents (Lancaster) Act 1551	An Acte for writtes uppon proclamation and exigentes to be currant within the countye palatyne of Lancaster.	The whole Act, except so much of sections one and five as relates to corners in cases other than civil cases.
1 Mar. st. 2. c. 8	Sheriff Act 1553	An Act that sheriffs shall not be justices of peace during that office.	The whole Act.
5 Eliz. 1. c. 23	Writ De Excommunicato Capiendo Act 1562	An Acte for the due execution of the writ de excommunicato capiendo.	Section one from "and if the sheriffes return" to the end of the section; and section four.
27 Eliz. 1. c. 12	Swearing of Under-Sheriffs Act 1584	An Act for the swearing of under sheriffs and other under officers and mynisters.	The whole Act so far as unrepealed.
29 Eliz. 1. c. 4	Sheriff's Poundage, etc. Act 1586	An Acte to prevent extortion in Sheriff's, under-sheriffs, and Bayliffes of Franchesies or Liberties in cases of execution.	The whole Act.
43 Eliz. 1. c. 6	Frivolous Suits Act 1601	An Acte to avoide trifling and frivolous suites in law in Her Majesties courtes at Westm.	The whole Act so far as unrepealed.
14 Cha. 2. c. 21	Expenses of Sheriffs Act 1662	An Act for preventing the unnecessary charge of sheriffs and for ease in passing theire accounts.	The whole Act so far as unrepealed.
7 & 8 Will. 3. c. 25	Parliamentary Elections Act 1695	An Act for the further regulating elections of members to serve in Parliament and for the preventing irregular proceedings of sheriffs and other officers in the electing and returning such members.	Section eight.
6 Ann. c. 12 (Note: 5 & 6 Anne, c. 9. in Ruff.)	Prison (Escape) Act 1706	An Act for rendring more effectual an Act passed in the first year of Her Majesties reign, intituled An Act for the better preventing escapes out of the Queen's Bench and Fleet prisons.	Section five.
6 Ann. c. 31 (Note: 5 & 6 Anne, in Ruff.)	Apprehension of Housebreakers Act 1706	An Act for the encouragement of the discovery and apprehending of housebreakers.	The whole Act so far as unrepealed.
6 Ann. c. 41 (Note: c. 7. in Ruff.)	Succession to the Crown Act 1707	An Act for the security of Her Majesty's person and government and of the succession to the crown of Great Britain in the Protestant Line.	So much of section eight as relates to sheriffs.
3 Geo. 1. c. 15	Estreats Act 1716	An Act for the better regulating the office of sheriffs, and for ascertaining their fees, and the fees for suing out their patents and passing their accounts.	The whole Act so far as it is unrepealed except section twelve.
1 Geo. 2. St. 1. c. 5	Demise of the Crown Act 1727	An Act for making further provision to enable persons possessed of offices at the demise of His late Majesty to qualify themselves for the enjoyment of such offices; and for altering and explaining the Acts of Parliament therein mentioned in relation to qualifying persons for continuing in offices, and to the continuance of the sheriffs of the county of Cornwall and county palatine of Chester, and several other officers therein mentioned, after the demise of His late Majesty; and for continuing such laws as would expire at the end of this session of Parliament.	So much of section seven as relates to any sheriff.
13 Geo. 2. c. 18	Laws Continuance, etc. Act 1739	An Act, the title of which begins with the words "An Act to continue several laws therein mentioned;" and ends with the words "liberties and franchises to have such clerks as dwelling within themselves."	Section six.
20 Geo. 2. c. 37	Return of Process by Sheriffs Act 1746	An Act for the ease of sheriffs with regard to the return of process.	The whole Act.
24 Geo. 2. c. 48	Michaelmas Term Act 1750	An Act for the abbreviation of Michaelmas term.	Section twelve.
32 Geo. 2. c. 28	Debtors Imprisonment Act 1758	An Act for relief of debtors with respect to the imprisonment of their persons: That no person who shall be in execution shall continue in execution in prison beyond a certain time and for sums not exceeding what are mentioned herein: and to make discovery of and deliver upon oath their estates for their creditors benefit.	Sections one to four, and so much of sections eleven and twelve as relate to sheriffs and their officers.
4 Geo. 4. c. 37	Levy of Fines Act 1823	An Act to amend an Act for the more speedy recovery of fines, penalties, and forfeitures and recognizances estreated.	Section one, from "and every sheriff, or other officer is hereby authorized and required on quitting his office to deliver the same"; and Section twenty.
3 & 4 Will. 4. c. 42	Civil Procedure Act 1833	An Act for the further amendment of the law and the better advancement of justice.	Sections two to seven, nine to eleven, so much of sections thirty-nine and forty as relates to the portions repealed by this Act, from "but that the" to end of section and Schedule.
3 & 4 Will. 4. c. 99	Fines Act 1833	An Act for facilitating the appointment of sheriffs, and the more effectual audit and passing of their accounts; and for the more speedy return and recovery of fines, issues, forfeited recognizances, penalties and deodands; and to abolish certain offices in the Court of Exchequer.	Sections two to seven, nine to eleven, so much of sections thirty-nine and forty as relates to the portions repealed by this Act, also section forty from "but that the" to end of section and the Schedule.
6 & 7 Will. 4. c. 19	Durham (County Palatine) Act 1836	An Act for separating the palatine jurisdiction of the county palatine of Durham from the bishopric of Durham.	Section two.
7 Will. 4 & 1 Vict. c. 55	Sheriff's Fees Act 1837	An Act for better regulating the fees payable to sheriffs upon the execution of civil process.	The whole Act so far as unrepealed.
5 & 6 Vict. c. 98	Prisons Act 1842	An Act to amend the law concerning prisons.	Section thirty-one so far as relates to sheriffs and their officers.
8 & 9 Vict. c. 11	Sheriffs (Wales) Act 1845	An Act for indemnifying sheriffs in Wales.	The whole Act.
9 & 10 Vict. c. 44	Election of Members for Cheshire Act 1846	An Act relative to an Act, to the election of members to serve in Parliament for the county of Chester, the borough situate therein, and the city and county of the city of Chester.	The whole Act.
13 & 14 Vict. c. 30	Sheriff of Westmorland Act 1850	An Act to provide for the appointment of sheriff of the county of Westmoreland.	The whole Act.
22 & 23 Vict. c. 21	Queen's Remembrancer Act 1859	An Act to regulate the office of Queen's Remembrancer and to amend the practice and procedure on the Revenue side of the Court of Exchequer.	Sections twenty-eight twenty-nine, and forty-two.
22 & 23 Vict. c. 32	County and Borough Police Act 1859	An Act to amend the law concerning the police in counties and boroughs in England and Wales.	Section nineteen.
28 & 29 Vict. c. 104	Crown Suits, &c. Act 1865	The Crown Suits, &c. Act, 1865.	Section twenty-five.
28 & 29 Vict. c. 126	Prison Act 1865	The Prison Act, 1865.	Sections fifty-nine and sixty.
40 & 41 Vict. c. 21	Prison Act 1865	The Prison Act, 1877.	Sections thirty-one and thirty-two.
42 & 43 Vict. c. 1	Spring Assizes Act 1879	The Spring Assizes Act, 1879.	Section three down to "had not passed."
44 & 45 Vict. c. 68	Supreme Court of Judicature Act 1881	The Supreme Court of Judicature Act, 1881.	Section sixteen.

== See also ==
- Statute Law Revision Act
