= Mortuaries (Bangor, &c.) Abolition Act 1713 =

Act of the Parliament of Great Britain

Mortuaries (Bangor, &c.) Abolition Act 1713 (Note: The citation of this act by this short title was authorised by section 1 of, and the first schedule to, the Short Titles Act 1896. Due to the repeal of those provisions it is now authorised by section 19(2) of the Interpretation Act 1978.)
- Act of Parliament
- Parliament of Great Britain
- Long title: An Act for taking away Mortuaries within the Dioceses of Bangor, Landaff, St. David's, and St. Asaph, and giving a Recompense therefor to the Bishops of the said respective Dioceses. . . . (Note: These words are printed against this act in the second column of the first schedule to the Short Titles Act 1896, which is headed "Title".)
- Citation: 13 Ann. c. 6 (Note: This is the citation in The Statutes of the Realm.); 12 Ann. St. 2. c. 6 (Note: This is the citation in The Statutes at Large.)
- Territorial extent: Great Britain

Dates
- Royal assent: 5 June 1714
- Commencement: 24 June 1714 (Note: Section 1.)
- Repealed: 1 January 1926
Other legislation
Amended by	Statute Law Revision Act 1887; Law of Property Act 1922
Repealed by	Law of Property (Amendment) Act 1924

Status: Repealed

Text of statute as originally enacted

The Mortuaries (Bangor, &c.) Abolition Act 1713 (13 Ann. c. 6) was an act of the Parliament of Great Britain.

The act is cited as 12 Ann. St. 2 c. 6 in common printed editions.

== Subsequent developments ==
The title, from "and for confirming" to end of title, and section 1 of the act from "the said proviso" to "repealed annulled and void and", was repealed by section 1 of, and the schedule to, the Statute Law Revision Act 1887 (50 & 51 Vict. c. 59), which came into force on 16 September 1887.

The whole act, being an enactment which, as respects England and Wales, was rendered obsolete by the Law of Property Act 1922 (12 & 13 Geo. 5. c. 16), was repealed by section 10 and 12(4)of, and schedule 10, to the Law of Property (Amendment) Act 1924 (15 & 16 Geo. 5. c. 5), which came into force on 1 January 1926.
