= Ordinances of Corporations Act 1503 =

Act of the Parliament of England

Ordinances of Corporations Act 1503 (Note: The citation of this act by this short title was authorised by section 5 of, and the second schedule to, the Statute Law Revision Act 1948. Due to the repeal of those provisions, it is now authorised by section 19(2) of the Interpretation Act 1978.)
- Act of Parliament
- Parliament of England
- Long title: De privatis & illicitis statutis non faciendis. (Note: These words are printed against this act in the second column of the second schedule to the Statute Law Revision Act 1948, which is headed "Title".)
- Citation: 19 Hen. 7. c. 7
- Territorial extent: England and Wales

Dates
- Royal assent: 25 January 1504
- Commencement: 26 May 1504 (O.S.); 5 June 1504(N.S.); (Note: Section 3. The Feast of Pentecost.)
- Repealed: 5 November 1993
Other legislation
Amended by	Statute Law Revision Act 1887
Repealed by	Statute Law (Repeals) Act 1993
Relates to	Guilds and Fraternities Act 1436

Status: Repealed

Text of statute as originally enacted

Revised text of statute as amended

The Ordinances of Corporations Act 1503 (19 Hen. 7. c. 7) was an act of the Parliament of England.

== Subsequent developments ==
Section 3 of the act was repealed by section 1 of, and the schedule to, the Statute Law Revision Act 1887 (50 & 51 Vict. c. 59), which came into force on 16 September 1887.

The whole act was repealed by section 1(1) of, and group 1 of part V of schedule 1 to, the Statute Law (Repeals) Act 1993, which came into force on 5 November 1993.
