= Prison Act =

Stock short title used for legislation

In Malaysia and the United Kingdom, the short title Prison Act (with its variations) refers to legislation relating to prisons.

== List ==
=== Malaysia ===
- The Prison Act 1995

=== United Kingdom ===
- The Prison (Escape) Act 1706 (1 Ann. c. 1)
- The Prison (Escape) Act 1742 (16 Geo. 2. c. 31)
- The Prison Ministers Act 1863 (26 & 27 Vict. c. 79)
- The Central Criminal Court (Prisons) Act 1881 (44 & 45 Vict. c. 64)
- The Prison Act 1898 (61 & 62 Vict. c. 41)
- The Prison Act 1952 (15 & 16 Geo. 6 & 1 Eliz. 2. c. 52)
- The Prisons (Scotland) Act 1952 (15 & 16 Geo. 6 & 1 Eliz. 2. c. 61)
- The Prisons (Scotland) Act 1989 (c. 45)
- The Prison Security Act 1992 (c. 25)
- The Prisons (Alcohol Testing) Act 1997 (c. 38)

Act of the Parliament of Northern Ireland

- The Prison Act (Northern Ireland) 1953 (c. 18) (NI)

Northern Ireland Order in Council

- The Prison (Amendment) (Northern Ireland) Order 2004 (SI 2004/704) (NI 7)

The Prison Acts 1865 to 1893 refers the following acts:

- The Prison Act 1865 (28 & 29 Vict. c. 126)
- The Prison Officers Compensation Act 1868 (31 & 32 Vict. c. 21)
- The Prison Act 1877 (40 & 41 Vict. c. 21)
- The Prison (Officers Superannuation) Act 1878 (41 & 42 Vict. c. 63)
- The Prison Act 1884 (47 & 48 Vict. c. 51)
- The Prison (Officers Superannuation) Act 1886 (49 & 50 Vict. c. 9)
- The Prison (Officers Superannuation) Act 1893 (56 & 57 Vict. c. 26)

The Prisons (Scotland) Acts 1860 to 1887 refers to the following acts:

- The Prisons (Scotland) Act 1860 (23 & 24 Vict. c. 105)
- The Lanark Prisons Act 1868 (31 & 32 Vict. c. 50)
- The Prisons (Scotland) Act 1877 (40 & 41 Vict. c. 53)
- The Prisons Officers Superannuation (Scotland) Act 1887 (50 & 51 Vict. c. 60)

The Prisons (Ireland) Acts 1826 to 1884 refers to the following acts:

- The Prisons (Ireland) Act 1826 (7 Geo. 4. c. 74)
- The Prisons (Ireland) Act 1840 (3 & 4 Vict. c. 44)
- The Prisons (Ireland) Act 1856 (19 & 20 Vict. c. 68)
- The Prison Officers Superannuation (Ireland) Act 1873 (36 & 37 Vict. c. 51)
- The General Prisons (Ireland) Act 1877 (40 & 41 Vict. c. 49)
- The Prison Service (Ireland) Act 1883 (46 & 47 Vict. c. 25)
- The Prisons (Ireland) Amendment Act 1884 (47 & 48 Vict. c. 36)

== See also ==
- List of short titles
