= Prison (Escape) Act 1706 =

Act of the Parliament of England

Prison (Escape) Act 1706 (Note: The citation of this act by this short title was authorised by section 1 of, and the first schedule to, the Short Titles Act 1896. Due to the repeal of those provisions it is now authorised by section 19(2) of the Interpretation Act 1978.)
- Act of Parliament
- Parliament of England
- Long title: An Act for rendring more effectual an Act, passed in the First Year of Her Majesties Reign, intituled, "An Act for the better preventing Escapes out of the Queen's Bench and Fleet Prisons." (Note: These words are printed against this act in the second column of the first schedule to the Short Titles Act 1896, which is headed "Title".)
- Citation: 6 Ann. c. 12 (Note: This is the citation in The Statutes of the Realm.); 5 Ann. c. 9 (Note: This is the citation in The Statutes at Large.)
- Territorial extent: England and Wales

Dates
- Royal assent: 6 March 1707
- Commencement: 3 December 1706 (Note: Start of session.)
- Repealed: 30 July 1948

Other legislation
- Amended by: Statute Law Revision Act 1887; Sheriffs Act 1887
- Repealed by: Statute Law Revision Act 1948

Status: Repealed

Text of statute as originally enacted

The Prison (Escape) Act 1706 (6 Ann. c. 12) was an act of the Parliament of England. It dealt with escapes from the King's Bench Prison and Fleet Prison.

The act is chapter 9 in common printed editions.

== Subsequent developments ==
Section 5 of the act was repealed by section 39 of, and the third schedule to, the Sheriffs Act 1887 (50 & 51 Vict. c. 55), which came into force on 16 September 1887.

Section 6 of the act was repealed by section 1 of, and the schedule to, the Statute Law Revision Act 1887 (50 & 51 Vict. c. 59), which came into force on 16 September 1887.

The whole act, so far as unrepealed, was repealed by section 1 of, and the first schedule to, the Statute Law Revision Act 1948 (11 & 12 Geo. 6. c. 62), which came into force on 30 July 1948.

== See also ==
- Prison Act
- Halsbury's Statutes
