= List of acts of the Parliament of England from 1503 =

This is a list of acts of the Parliament of England for the year 1503.

For acts passed during the period 1707–1800, see the list of acts of the Parliament of Great Britain. See also the list of acts of the Parliament of Scotland, and the list of acts of the Parliament of Ireland.

For acts passed from 1801 onwards, see the list of acts of the Parliament of the United Kingdom. For acts of the devolved parliaments and assemblies in the United Kingdom, see the list of acts of the Scottish Parliament, the list of acts of the Northern Ireland Assembly, and the list of acts and measures of Senedd Cymru; see also the list of acts of the Parliament of Northern Ireland.

For medieval statutes, etc. that are not considered to be acts of Parliament, see the list of English statutes.

See also the List of ordinances and acts of the Parliament of England, 1642–1660 for ordinances and acts passed by the Long Parliament and other bodies without royal assent, and which were not considered to be valid legislation following the Restoration in 1660.

The number shown after each act's title is its chapter number. Acts are cited using this number, preceded by the years of the reign during which the relevant parliamentary session was held; thus the Union with Ireland Act 1800 is cited as "39 & 40 Geo. 3. c. 67", meaning the 67th act passed during the session that started in the 39th year of the reign of George III and which finished in the 40th year of that reign. The modern convention is to use Arabic numerals in citations (thus "41 Geo. 3" rather than "41 Geo. III"). Acts of the last session of the Parliament of Great Britain and the first session of the Parliament of the United Kingdom are both cited as "41 Geo. 3".

Acts passed by the Parliament of England did not have a short title; however, some of these acts have subsequently been given a short title by acts of the Parliament of the United Kingdom, such as the Short Titles Act 1896 (59 & 60 Vict. c. 14).

Acts passed by the Parliament of England were deemed to have come into effect on the first day of the session in which they were passed. Because of this, the years given in the list below may in fact be the year before a particular act was passed.

== 19 Hen. 7 ==
The 7th Parliament of King Henry VII, which met from 25 January 1504.

This session was also traditionally cited as 19 H. 7.

Short title	Citation	Royal assent
Long title
Attendance in War Act 1503 (repealed)	19 Hen. 7. c. 1	25 January 1504 (Note: Start of session)
Pro attendancia Dno Regi facienda in Guerria. (Repealed by Statute Law Revision Act 1863 (26 & 27 Vict. c. 125))
Customs Act 1503 (repealed)	19 Hen. 7. c. 2	25 January 1504
De Custuma Arcuu ad tempus pdonand. (Repealed by Statute Law Revision Act 1863 (26 & 27 Vict. c. 125))
Attaints Act 1503 (repealed)	19 Hen. 7. c. 3	25 January 1504
De falsis Verdictis puniend. (Repealed by Statute Law Revision Act 1863 (26 & 27 Vict. c. 125))
Cross-bows Act 1503 (repealed)	19 Hen. 7. c. 4	25 January 1504
De Balistis non exercitand. (Repealed by Statute Law Revision Act 1863 (26 & 27 Vict. c. 125))
Coin Act 1503 (repealed)	19 Hen. 7. c. 5	25 January 1504
Pro Reformacoe Pecunias. (Repealed by Coinage Offences Act 1832 (2 & 3 Will. 4. c. 34))
Pewterers Act 1503 (repealed)	19 Hen. 7. c. 6	25 January 1504
Đ Pewtrers Walkyng. (Repealed by Repeal of Obsolete Statutes Act 1856 (19 & 20 Vict. c. 64))
Ordinances of Corporations Act 1503 (repealed)	19 Hen. 7. c. 7	25 January 1504
De privatis & illicitis statutis non faciendis. (Repealed by Statute Law (Repeals) Act 1993 (c. 50))
Scavage Act 1503 (repealed)	19 Hen. 7. c. 8	25 January 1504
De Scavagio non recipiendo de Subditis. (Repealed by Statute Law Revision Act 1863 (26 & 27 Vict. c. 125))
Process Act 1503 (repealed)	19 Hen. 7. c. 9	25 January 1504
De Processibs sup accoibs specialibs faciend. (Repealed by Statute Law Revision Act 1863 (26 & 27 Vict. c. 125))
Gaols Act 1503 (repealed)	19 Hen. 7. c. 10	25 January 1504
De voluntariis & negligentibs escapiis. (Repealed by Repeal of Obsolete Statutes Act 1856 (19 & 20 Vict. c. 64))
Deer, etc. Act 1503 (repealed)	19 Hen. 7. c. 11	25 January 1504
Đ Laquiis & retibȝ venanciʉ. (Repealed by Game Act 1831 (1 & 2 Will. 4. c. 3))
Vagabonds Act 1503 (repealed)	19 Hen. 7. c. 12	25 January 1504
Đ validis mendicantibȝ repellend. (Repealed by Continuance, etc. of Laws Act 1623 (21 Jas. 1. c. 28))
Riot Act 1503 or the Riots Act 1503 (repealed)	19 Hen. 7. c. 13	25 January 1504
Đ Riotis repremenđ. (Repealed by Juries Act 1825 (6 Geo. 4. c. 50))
Retainers Act 1503 (repealed)	19 Hen. 7. c. 14	25 January 1504
De Retentionibz illicitis. (Repealed by Statute Law Revision Act 1863 (26 & 27 Vict. c. 125))
Feoffments to Uses Act 1503 (repealed)	19 Hen. 7. c. 15	25 January 1504
De execucoibz contn feoffatos faciend. (Repealed by Statute Law Revision Act 1863 (26 & 27 Vict. c. 125))
Jurors Act 1503 (repealed)	19 Hen. 7. c. 16	25 January 1504
De reformacone Turnoa Vic in Com Suth Surre & Sussex. (Repealed by Statute Law Revision Act 1863 (26 & 27 Vict. c. 125))
Worsted Shearers Act 1503 (repealed)	19 Hen. 7. c. 17	25 January 1504
De Worsted Sherers. (Repealed by Statute Law Revision Act 1863 (26 & 27 Vict. c. 125))
Trade (Severn) Act 1503 (repealed)	19 Hen. 7. c. 18	25 January 1504
De Fluvio Sabrini. (Repealed by Statute Law Revision Act 1948 (11 & 12 Geo. 6. c. 62))
Curriers, etc. Act 1503 (repealed)	19 Hen. 7. c. 19	25 January 1504
De Coriariis Frumitoribs et Alotariis. (Repealed by Statute Law Revision Act 1863 (26 & 27 Vict. c. 125))
Costs in Error Act 1503 (repealed)	19 Hen. 7. c. 20	25 January 1504
De bribs Erroa repremend. (Repealed by Civil Procedure Acts Repeal Act 1879 (42 & 43 Vict. c. 59))
Silk Works Act 1503 (repealed)	19 Hen. 7. c. 21	25 January 1504
For Sylkewomen. (Repealed by Repeal of Acts Concerning Importation Act 1822 (3 Geo. 4. c. 41))
Calais Act 1503 (repealed)	19 Hen. 7. c. 22	25 January 1504
De Attornatis & fcoribs Villa Cales. (Repealed by Statute Law Revision Act 1863 (26 & 27 Vict. c. 125))
Hanse Merchants Act 1503 (repealed)	19 Hen. 7. c. 23	25 January 1504
For þͤ Stillyard. (Repealed by Repeal of Acts Concerning Importation Act 1822 (3 Geo. 4. c. 41))
Sussex Sheriff's County Court Act 1503 (repealed)	19 Hen. 7. c. 24	25 January 1504
De Turnis Vic apud Cicestr & Lewes vicissim tenend. (Repealed by Sheriffs Act 1887 (50 & 51 Vict. c. 55))
Duchy of Lancaster Act 1503	19 Hen. 7. c. 25	25 January 1504
De Feoffamento pro Regem fco.
Prince of Wales Act 1503 (repealed)	19 Hen. 7. c. 26	25 January 1504
Pro Principe. (Repealed by Statute Law (Repeals) Act 1978 (c. 45))
Staple at Calais Act 1503 (repealed)	19 Hen. 7. c. 27	25 January 1504
Composicio int Regem & Stapulam. (Repealed by Statute Law Revision Act 1863 (26 & 27 Vict. c. 125))
Power of the King to Reverse Attainders Act 1503 (repealed)	19 Hen. 7. c. 28	25 January 1504
De restituceo faciend ctis psonis pro Dnm Regem. (Repealed by Statute Law (Repeals) Act 1977 (c. 18))
Monastery of Syon Act 1503 (repealed)	19 Hen. 7. c. 29	25 January 1504
Pro Monastio Sci Salvatoris de Syon. (Repealed by Statute Law (Repeals) Act 1978 (c. 45))
Partition of Lands (Barkley and Earl of Surrey) Act 1503 (repealed)	19 Hen. 7. c. 30	25 January 1504
De Petitione Prtap Willi nup Marchionis Berkeley, & Thome Comitis Surr. (Repealed by Statute Law (Repeals) Act 1978 (c. 45))
Actions Act 1503 (repealed)	19 Hen. 7. c. 31	25 January 1504
Đ accionibȝ continuanđ ᵽ novis Militibȝ ꞙc̃is cū Dño Principe. (Repealed by Statute Law Revision Act 1863 (26 & 27 Vict. c. 125))
Taxation Act 1503 (repealed)	19 Hen. 7. c. 32	25 January 1504
Đ auxilio concesso & forma ejusdem. (Repealed by Statute Law Revision Act 1863 (26 & 27 Vict. c. 125))
Estates of Lord Wells Act 1503 (repealed)	19 Hen. 7. c. 33	25 January 1504
Ᵽ Domina Cecilia Vic Welles & al. (Repealed by Statute Law (Repeals) Act 1978 (c. 45))
Attainder of Lord Audley and Others Act 1503 (repealed)	19 Hen. 7. c. 34	25 January 1504
Billa attinccionis conviccois. (Repealed by Statute Law (Repeals) Act 1977 (c. 18))
Restitution of Robert Brewce Act 1503 (repealed)	19 Hen. 7. c. 35	25 January 1504
Đ Billa restitucois Robti Brews Armigi. (Repealed by Statute Law (Repeals) Act 1977 (c. 18))
Recovery of Damages by Sir Wm. Mearin Act 1503 (repealed)	19 Hen. 7. c. 36	25 January 1504
De Billa Willelmi Meryng Militis. (Repealed by Statute Law Revision Act 1948 (11 & 12 Geo. 6. c. 62))
Restitution of John Heron Act 1503 (repealed)	19 Hen. 7. c. 37	25 January 1504
Đ restitucióe ᵽ Jone Heyron. (Repealed by Statute Law (Repeals) Act 1977 (c. 18))
Restitution of Richard Berkley Act 1503 (repealed)	19 Hen. 7. c. 38	25 January 1504
Đ restitucióe ᵽ Rico Berkeley. (Repealed by Statute Law (Repeals) Act 1977 (c. 18))
Restitution of William Barley Act 1503 (repealed)	19 Hen. 7. c. 39	25 January 1504
Đ restitucióe ᵽ Willo Barlee. (Repealed by Statute Law (Repeals) Act 1977 (c. 18))
Restitution of John Harrington Act 1503 (repealed)	19 Hen. 7. c. 40	25 January 1504
Đ restitucióe ᵽ Jacobo Harryngton. (Repealed by Statute Law (Repeals) Act 1977 (c. 18))

=== Sources ===
- "19° Hen. VII.". The Statutes of the Realm. Vol. 2: 1377 to 1509. pp. 648–694 – via HathiTrust.
- "Anno decimo nono Henrici VII". The Statutes at Large. Vol. 4 - 1 Richard III to 31 Henry VIII - 1483-4 to 1539. pp. 82–103 – via Internet Archive.
- "Anno decimo nono Henrici VII". The Statutes at Large. Vol. 4 - 1 Richard III to 31 Henry VIII - 1483-4 to 1539. pp. 82–103 – via Internet Archive.
- "Anno decimo nono Henrici VII". The Statutes at Large. Vol. 4 - 1 Richard III to 31 Henry VIII - 1483-4 to 1539. pp. 82–103 – via Internet Archive.
- Chronological Table of and Index to the Statutes. Vol. 1: To the End of the Session 59 Vict. Sess. 2 (1895) (13th ed.). London: Her Majesty's Stationery Office. 1896. p. 43 – via Google Books.
- Chronological Table of the Statutes: Covering the Period from 1235 to the End of 1971. London: Her Majesty's Stationery Office. 1972. pp. 37–38. ISBN 978-0-11-840096-1 – via Google Books.
- "Acts of the English Parliament from 1503". legislation.gov.uk. The National Archives.

== See also ==
- List of acts of the Parliament of England
