= Occasional Conformity Act 1711 =

Act of the Parliament of Great Britain

- Act of Parliament
- Parliament of Great Britain
- Long title: An Act for preserving the Protestant Religion by better securing the Church of England as by Law established and for confirming the Toleration granted to Protestant Dissenters by an Act intituled An Act for exempting Their Majesties Protestant Subjects dissenting from the Church of England from the Penalties of certain Laws and for supplying the Defects thereof and for the further securing the Protestant Succession by requiring the Practicers of the Law in North Britain to take the Oaths and subscribe the Declaration therein mentioned
- Citation: 10 Ann. c. 6 (Note: This is the citation in The Statutes of the Realm.); 10 Ann. c. 2 (Note: This is the citation in The Statutes at Large.)
- Territorial extent: Great Britain

Dates
- Royal assent: 22 December 1711
- Commencement: 25 March 1712 (Note: Start of session.)
- Repealed: 13 July 1871

Other legislation
- Amended by: Religious Worship Act 1718; Statute Law Revision Act 1867
- Repealed by: Promissory Oaths Act 1871
- Relates to: Toleration Act 1688

Status: Repealed

Text of statute as originally enacted

The Occasional Conformity Act (10 Ann. c. 6), also known as the Occasional Conformity Act 1711 or the Toleration Act 1711, was an act of the Parliament of Great Britain which passed on 20 December 1711. Previous Occasional Conformity bills had been debated in 1702 and 1704, the latter causing the 'Tackers' controversy. It was passed by the Tories to undermine the Whig party, and to ensure that elections to Parliament were in effect under the control of Anglicans, i.e. non-conformists locked out. It applied to any national or local official in England, Wales or the Channel Islands who was required to attend Church of England services and take the Lord's Supper. If such a person attended "any conventicle, assembly or meeting" of any other religion, they would be subject to a penalty of £40 and permanently barred from government employment. (This part of the Act did not extend to Scotland, the independence of whose Presbyterian state church (kirk) was guaranteed by the Acts of Union. However, a part requiring the taking of an oath by legal professionals applied only to Scotland).

A notable occasional conformist had been the Queen's husband, Prince George, a practising Lutheran; despite this, he had voted for the earlier failed bill in the House of Lords at his wife's request, but died in 1708 before the passage of the act.

== Purpose ==
Its purpose was to prevent Nonconformists and Roman Catholics from taking "occasional" communion in the Church of England in order to become eligible for public office under the Corporation Act 1661 and the Test Act. Under these acts only members of the Church of England were allowed to hold any office of public trust. The 1711 Act was repealed in 1719. When it was in effect it had little impact. Non-conformist officials were either protected by powerful patrons, or attended private services that were not covered.

Contemporary Whig-aligned histories criticised the measure as contrary to liberty and the constitution; in his multi-volume History of England (1744–46), James Ralph condemned the Occasional Conformity Bill alongside proposals to restrain the press, portraying both as symptoms of corrosive party politics.

== Hypocrisy ==
Hypocrisy became a major topic in English political history in the early 18th century. The Toleration Act 1688 (1 Will. & Mar. c. 18) allowed for certain rights, but it kept Protestant Nonconformists (such as Congregationalists and Baptists) deprived of high civic rights, including that of office-holding. Nonconformists who wanted office ostentatiously took the Anglican sacrament once a year to avoid these bans. High Church Anglicans were outraged and outlawed what they called "occasional conformity" in 1711 with the act. In the political controversies using sermons, speeches, and pamphlet wars, both high churchmen and Nonconformists attacked their opponents as insincere and hypocritical, as well as dangerously zealous, in contrast to their own moderation. This campaign of moderation versus zealotry peaked in 1709 during the impeachment trial of high church preacher Henry Sacheverell. By its very ferocity, the debate may have contributed subsequently to more temperate and less charged political discourse. Occasional conformity was restored by the Whigs when they returned to power in 1719.

== Subsequent developments ==
Section 10 of the act was repealed by section 1 of, and the schedule to, the Statute Law Revision Act 1867 (30 & 31 Vict. c. 59), which came into force on 15 July 1867.
