= List of acts of the Parliament of Great Britain from 1713 =

This is a complete list of acts of the Parliament of Great Britain for the year 1713.

For acts passed until 1707, see the list of acts of the Parliament of England and the list of acts of the Parliament of Scotland. See also the list of acts of the Parliament of Ireland.

For acts passed from 1801 onwards, see the list of acts of the Parliament of the United Kingdom. For acts of the devolved parliaments and assemblies in the United Kingdom, see the list of acts of the Scottish Parliament, the list of acts of the Northern Ireland Assembly, and the list of acts and measures of Senedd Cymru; see also the list of acts of the Parliament of Northern Ireland.

The number shown after each act's title is its chapter number. Acts are cited using this number, preceded by the year(s) of the reign during which the relevant parliamentary session was held; thus the Union with Ireland Act 1800 is cited as "39 & 40 Geo. 3. c. 67", meaning the 67th act passed during the session that started in the 39th year of the reign of George III and which finished in the 40th year of that reign. Note that the modern convention is to use Arabic numerals in citations (thus "41 Geo. 3" rather than "41 Geo. III"). Acts of the last session of the Parliament of Great Britain and the first session of the Parliament of the United Kingdom are both cited as "41 Geo. 3".

Acts passed by the Parliament of Great Britain did not have a short title; however, some of these acts have subsequently been given a short title by acts of the Parliament of the United Kingdom (such as the Short Titles Act 1896).

Before the Acts of Parliament (Commencement) Act 1793 came into force on 8 April 1793, acts passed by the Parliament of Great Britain were deemed to have come into effect on the first day of the session in which they were passed. Because of this, the years given in the list below may in fact be the year before a particular act was passed.

== 13 Ann. ==
The first session of the 4th Parliament of Great Britain, which met from 16 February 1714 until 9 July 1714.

This session was also traditionally cited as 13 Anne, 13 A., 12 Anne, Stat. 2, 12 Ann. St. 2 (Ruffhead's Statutes at Large), or 12 A. St. 2.

=== Public acts ===
Short title	Citation	Royal assent
Long title
Land Tax Act 1713 (repealed)	13 Ann. c. 1 (Note: This is the citation in The Statutes of the Realm.); 12 Ann. St. 2. c. 1 (Note: This is the citation in The Statutes at Large.)	11 May 1714
An Act for granting an Aid to Her Majesty, to be raised by a Land Tax in Great Britain, for the Service of the Year One Thousand Seven Hundred and Fourteen. (Repealed by Statute Law Revision Act 1867 (30 & 31 Vict. c. 59))
Taxation, etc. Act 1713 (repealed)	13 Ann. c. 2; 12 Ann. St. 2. c. 3	28 May 1714
An Act for charging and continuing the Duties upon Malt, Mum, Cyder, and Perry, for the Service of the Year One Thousand Seven Hundred and Fourteen; and for the Encouragement of the distilling Brandy from malted Corn and Cyder; and for making forth Duplicates of Exchequer Bills and Lottery Tickets, lost, burnt, or destroyed; and to enable the Governor and Company of the Bank of England, and others, to lend Money upon South Sea Stock. (Repealed by Statute Law Revision Act 1867 (30 & 31 Vict. c. 59))
Taxation Act 1713 (repealed)	13 Ann. c. 3; 12 Ann. St. 2. c. 2	11 May 1714
An Act for allowing a Drawback upon the Exportation of Salt, to be made Use of for the curing of Fish taken at North Seas or at Isleland. (Repealed by Salt Duty Act 1815 (55 Geo. 3. c. 179))
Mutiny Act 1713 (repealed)	13 Ann. c. 4; 12 Ann. St. 2. c. 4	5 June 1714
An Act for the better regulating the Forces to be continued in Her Majesty's Service; and for the Payment of the said Forces, and of their Quarters. (Repealed by Statute Law Revision Act 1867 (30 & 31 Vict. c. 59))
Taxation (No. 2) Act 1713 (repealed)	13 Ann. c. 5; 12 Ann. St. 2. c. 5	5 June 1714
An Act for taking away the new additional Duty of Thirty Pounds per Centum ad Valorem, imposed upon all Books and Prints imported into Great Britain, by an Act made in the Tenth Year of the Reign of Her present Majesty Queen Ann. (Note: Taxation Act 1711 (10 Ann. c. 18)) (Repealed by Statute Law Revision Act 1867 (30 & 31 Vict. c. 59))
Mortuaries (Bangor, &c.) Abolition Act 1713 (repealed)	13 Ann. c. 6; 12 Ann. St. 2. c. 6	5 June 1714
An Act for taking away Mortuaries, within the Dioceses of Bangor, Landaff, St. David's, and St. Asaph, and giving a Recompense therefor to the Bishops of the said respective Dioceses; and for confirming several Letters Patents granted by Her Majesty, for perpetually annexing a Prebend of Gloucester to the Mastership of Pembroke College in Oxford, and a Prebend of Rochester to the Provostship of Oriel College in Oxford, and a Prebend of Norwich to the Mastership of Catherine Hall in Cambridge. (Repealed by Law of Property (Amendment) Act 1924 (15 & 16 Geo. 5. c. 5))
Established Church Act 1713 or the Schism Act 1714 (repealed)	13 Ann. c. 7; 12 Ann. St. 2. c. 7	25 June 1714
An Act to prevent the Growth of Schism, and for the further Security of the Churches of England and Ireland as by Law established. (Repealed by Religious Worship Act 1718 (5 Geo. 1. c. 4))
Tobacco Trade Act 1713 (repealed)	13 Ann. c. 8; 12 Ann. St. 2. c. 8	25 June 1714
An Act for encouraging the Tobacco Trade. (Repealed by Statute Law Revision Act 1867 (30 & 31 Vict. c. 59))
Militia, etc. Act 1713 (repealed)	13 Ann. c. 9; 12 Ann. St. 2. c. 10	9 July 1714
An Act for raising the Militia for the Year One Thousand Seven Hundred and Fourteen, although the Month's Pay formerly advanced be not re-paid; and for rectifying a Mistake in an Act passed in this present Session of Parliament, intituled, "An Act for the regulating the Forces to be continued in Her Majesty's Service, and for Payment of the said Forces and their Quarters." (Note: Mutiny Act 1713 (13 Ann. c. 4)) (Repealed by Statute Law Revision Act 1867 (30 & 31 Vict. c. 59))
Enlistment in Foreign Service Act 1713 (repealed)	13 Ann. c. 10; 12 Ann. St. 2. c. 11	9 July 1714
An Act to prevent the listing Her Majesty's Subjects, to serve as Soldiers, without Her Majesty's License. (Repealed by Statute Law Revision Act 1867 (30 & 31 Vict. c. 59))
Simony Act 1713 (repealed)	13 Ann. c. 11; 12 Ann. St. 2. c. 12	9 July 1714
An Act for the better Maintenance of Curates within the Church of England within the Church of England; and for preventing any Ecclesiastical Persons from buying the next Avoidance of any Church Preferment. (Repealed by Statute Law (Repeals) Act 1971 (c. 52))
Equivalent Act 1713 (repealed)	13 Ann. c. 12; 12 Ann. St. 2. c. 13	9 July 1714
An Act to discharge and acquit the Commissioners of Equivalent, for the Sum of Three Hundred Eighty-one Thousand Five Hundred and Nine Pounds, Fifteen Shillings, Ten Pence Half-penny, by them duly issued, out of the Sum of Three Hundred Ninety-eight Thousand Eighty-five Pounds, Ten Shillings, which they received. (Repealed by Statute Law Revision Act 1867 (30 & 31 Vict. c. 59))
Presentation of Benefices Act 1713 (repealed)	13 Ann. c. 13; 12 Ann. St. 2. c. 14	9 July 1714
An Act for rendring more effectual an Act made in the third Year of the Reign of King James the First, intituled, "An Act to prevent and avoid Dangers which may grow by Popish Recusants;" (Note: Presentation of Benefices Act 1605 (3 Jas. 1. c. 5)) and also of one other Act made in the first Year of the Reign of their late Majesties King William and Queen Mary intituled, "An Act to vest in the two Universities the Presentations of Benefices belonging to Papists;" (Note: Presentation of Benefices Act 1688 (1 Will. & Mar. c. 26)) and for vesting in the Lords of Justiciary Power to inflict the same Punishments against Jesuits, Priests and other trafficking Papists, which the Privy Council of Scotland was impowered to do by an Act passed in the Parliament of Scotland, intituled, "An Act for preventing the Growth of Popery." (Note: Popery Act 1700 (c. 3 (S))) (Repealed by Patronage (Benefices) Measure 1986 (No 3) and Statute Law (Repeals) Act 1989 (c. 43))
Discovery of Longitude at Sea Act 1713 (repealed)	13 Ann. c. 14; 12 Ann. St. 2. c. 15	9 July 1714
An Act for Providing a Publick Reward for such Person or Persons as shall Discover the Longitude at Sea. (Repealed by Discovery of Longitude at Sea, etc. Act 1818 (58 Geo. 3. c. 20))
Usury Act 1713 (repealed)	13 Ann. c. 15; 12 Ann. St. 2. c. 16	9 July 1714
An Act to reduce the Rate of Interest, without any Prejudice to Parliamentary Securities. (Repealed by Usury Laws Repeal Act 1854 (17 & 18 Vict. c. 90))
Yarmouth Chapel of Ease Act 1713 (repealed)	13 Ann. c. 16; 12 Ann. St. 2. c. 1 Pr.	11 May 1714
An Act for the building a new Church, or Chapel of Ease, in Great Yarmouth, in the County of Norfolk, by a Duty or Imposition on all Coals, Culm, and Cinders, to be landed there. (Repealed by Saint George's Chapel and Street Lighting, Yarmouth Act 1720 (7 Geo. 1. St. 1. c. 11))
Wilts Highways Act 1713 (repealed)	13 Ann. c. 17; 12 Ann. St. 2. c. 2 Pr.	11 May 1714
An Act for repairing the Highways between Shepherd's Shord and Horsley Upright Gate, leading down Bagdon Hill, in the County of Wilts, and other ruinous Parts of Highways thereunto adjacent. (Repealed by Wiltshire Highway Act 1728 (2 Geo. 2. c. 12))
Stamps Act 1713 (repealed)	13 Ann. c. 18; 12 Ann. St. 2. c. 9	9 July 1714
An Act for laying additionall Duties on Sope and Paper, and upon certain Linnens, Silks, Calncoes, and Stuffs, and upon Starch and exported Coals, and upon stampt Vellum, Parchment, and Paper, for raising One million four hundred thousand Pounds, by way of a Lottery, for Her Majesties Supply; and for Allowances on exporting made Wares, of Leather, Sheep-skins, and Lamb-skins; and for Distribution of Four thousand Pounds, due to the Officers and Seamen for Gun-money; and to adjust the Property of Tickets in former Lotteries; and touching certain Shares of Stock in the Capital of the South Sea Company; and for appropriating the Monies granted to Her Majesty. (Repealed by Inland Revenue Repeal Act 1870 (33 & 34 Vict. c. 99))
River Nene (Northampton to Peterborough) Navigation Act 1713 (repealed)	13 Ann. c. 19; 12 Ann. St. 2. c. 7 Pr.	28 May 1714
An Act for making the River Nine, or Nen, running from Northampton to Peterborough, navigable. (Repealed by Nene Valley Drainage and Navigation Improvement Act 1852 (15 & 16 Vict. c. cxxviii))
Repair of Breach in Thames Bank at Dagenham Coal Duties Act 1713 (repealed)	13 Ann. c. 20; 12 Ann. St. 2. c. 17	9 July 1714
An Act for the speedy and effectual preserving the Navigation of the River of Thames, by stopping the Breach in the Levels of Haveringham and Dagenham, in the County of Essex; and for ascertaining the Coal Measure. (Repealed by Statute Law Revision Act 1871 (34 & 35 Vict. c. 116) and Statute Law Revision Act 1948 (11 & 12 Geo. 6. c. 62))
Stranded Ships Act 1713 (repealed)	13 Ann. c. 21; 12 Ann. St. 2. c. 18	9 July 1714
An Act for the preserving all such Ships, and Goods thereof, which shall happen to be forced on Shore, or stranded, upon the Coasts of this Kingdom, or any other of Her Majesties Dominions. (Repealed by Merchant Shipping Repeal Act 1854 (17 & 18 Vict. c. 120))
Taxation (No. 3) Act 1713 (repealed)	13 Ann. c. 22; 12 Ann. St. 2. c. 19	9 July 1714
An Act to explain a Clause in an Act of Parliament of the Tenth Year of Her Majesty's Reign, for laying several Duties upon all Soap and Paper made in Great Britain, or imported into the same; and upon chequered and striped Linen imported; and upon certain Silks, Callicoes, Linens, and Stuffs, printed, painted, or stained; and upon several Kinds of stamped Vellum, Parchment, and Paper; and upon certain printed Pamphlets and Advertisements, for raising the Sum of One Million Eight Hundred Thousand Pounds, by Way of a Lottery; and for other Purposes in the said Act mentioned, so far as the said Act relates to Lawns, Canvas, Buckrams, Barras, and Silesia Neckcloths. (Repealed by Statute Law Revision Act 1867 (30 & 31 Vict. c. 59))
Linen Cloth Manufacture (Scotland) Act 1713 (repealed)	13 Ann. c. 23; 12 Ann. St. 2. c. 20	9 July 1714
An Act to explain and make more effectual an Act passed in the Tenth Year of Her Majesty's Reign, (Note: Linen Manufacture (Scotland) Act 1711 (10 Ann. c. 23)) for preventing Abuses in making Linen Cloth, and regulating the Lengths and Breadths and equal Sorting of Yarn, in each Piece made in Scotland; and for whitening the same. (Repealed by Linen and Hempen Manufactures (Scotland) Act 1823 (4 Geo. 4. c. 40))
Taxation (No. 4) Act 1713 (repealed)	13 Ann. c. 24; 12 Ann. St. 2. c. 21	9 July 1714
An Act to explain Part of an Act made in the Seventh Year of Her Majesty's Reign (Note: Bank of England Act 1708 (7 Ann. c. 30)) (for enlarging the Capital Stock of the Bank of England, and for raising a further Supply to Her Majesty for the Service of the Year One Thousand Seven Hundred and Nine), so far as the same relates to unwrought Incle imported into this Kingdom. (Repealed by Statute Law Revision Act 1867 (30 & 31 Vict. c. 59))
Duchy of Cornwall Act 1713 (repealed)	13 Ann. c. 25; 12 Ann. St. 2. c. 22	9 July 1714
An Act to continue an Act of the Sixth Year of Her Majesty's Reign, intituled, "An Act to enable Her Majesty to make Leases, and Copies of Offices, Lands, and Hereditaments, Parcel of Her Dutchy of Cornwal, or annexed to the same." (Note: Duchy of Cornwall Act 1707 (6 Ann. c. 52)) (Repealed by Statute Law Revision Act 1948 (11 & 12 Geo. 6. c. 62))
Vagrants Act 1713 or the Vagrancy Act 1714 (repealed)	13 Ann. c. 26; 12 Ann. St. 2. c. 23	9 July 1714
An Act for reducing the Laws relating to Rogues, Vagabonds, sturdy Beggars, and Vagrants, into One Act of Parliament; and for the more effectual punishing such Rogues, Vagabonds, sturdy Beggars, and Vagrants, and sending them whither they ought to be sent. (Repealed by Vagrants Act 1739 (13 Geo. 2. c. 24))
Worcester Highways Act 1713 (repealed)	13 Ann. c. 27; 12 Ann. St. 2. c. 3 Pr.	11 May 1714
An Act for repairing the Highway, or Road, from the City of Worcester, to the Borough of Droitwich, in the County of Worcester. (Repealed by Worcester Roads Act 1793 (33 Geo. 3. c. 175))
Berkshire Highways Act 1713 (repealed)	13 Ann. c. 28; 12 Ann. St. 2. c. 4 Pr.	11 May 1714
An Act for repairing the Highways between The Bear Inn in Reading, (Note: The Bear Inn, Bridge Street, Reading. 51°27′11″N 0°58′23″W) in the County of Berks, and a certain Place called Punt Field, (Note: Puntfield is the location of the Spring Inn, near Sulhamstead. 51°25′21″N 1°06′20″W) in the said County. (Repealed by Berkshire Roads Act 1771 (11 Geo. 3. c. 70))
Dunstable Highways Act 1713	13 Ann. c. 29; 12 Ann. St. 2. c. 6 Pr.	28 May 1714
An Act for making more effectual an Act, passed in the Ninth Year of Her present Majesties Reign, intituled, "An Act for repairing the Highways between a Dunstable and Hockley in the County of Bedford." (Note: Dunstable Highways Act 1710 (9 Ann. c. 34))
Edinburgh Bridges and Highways Act 1713 (repealed)	13 Ann. c. 30; 12 Ann. St. 2. c. 10 Pr.	5 June 1714
An Act for upholding and repairing the Bridges and Highways in the County of Edinburgh. (Repealed by Roads and Bridges (Scotland) Act 1878 (41 & 42 Vict. c. 51) (Note: The Chronological Table of the Statutes prints this citation as “1879 c. 51”; the Act is listed as 1878 c. 51.) and Local Government (Scotland) Act 1889 (52 & 53 Vict. c. 50))
Tittensor Turnpike Act 1713 (repealed)	13 Ann. c. 31; 12 Ann. St. 2. c. 14 Pr.	25 June 1714
An Act for repairing and amending the Highways, between the Town or Village of Tittensor, and the most Northern Part of Talke on the Hill in Butlane in the County of Stafford. (Repealed by Darlaston Turnpike Act 1779 (19 Geo. 3. c. 119) (Note: The Chronological Table of the Statutes also prints “3 Geo. 4. c. lxviii”; that citation is the unrelated Royston and Wandesford Bridge Road Act 1822, not a repeal of this Staffordshire Act. The later Darlaston Turnpike Act 1823 repealed the 1779 consolidation Act, rather than this 1713 Act directly.))
Bristol (Poor Relief) Act 1713 (repealed)	13 Ann. c. 32; 12 Ann. St. 2. c. 15 Pr.	25 June 1714
An Act for making more effectual an Act, passed in the Seventh and Eighth Year of the Reign of His late Majesty King William the Third, intituled, "An Act for erecting of Hospitals and Workhouses within the City of Bristol for the better employing and maintaining the Poor thereof." (Note: Bristol Workhouse Act 1695 (7 & 8 Will. 3. c. 32 Pr.)) (Repealed by Bristol Improvement Act 1822 (3 Geo. 4. c. xxiv))
Royston and Wandesford Bridge Road Act 1713 (repealed)	13 Ann. c. 33; 12 Ann. St. 2. c. 16 Pr.	25 June 1714
An Act for the more effectual amending the Highways, leading from Royston, in the County of Hertford, to Wandsford Bridge, in the County of Huntingdon. (Repealed by Road from Royston to Wandesford Bridge Act 1815 (55 Geo. 3. c. xxxv) and Royston and Wandesford Bridge Road Act 1822 (3 Geo. 4. c. lxviii))

=== Private acts ===
Short title	Citation	Royal assent
Long title
Olliver's Estate Act 1713	13 Ann. c. 1 Pr.	11 May 1714
An Act for Sale of Part of the Estate of Joseph Olliver Gentleman, lying in the County of Devon and City of Exon, for Payment of his Debts, and for making Provision for Maintenance and Education of his Daughter.
Smyth's Estate Act 1713	13 Ann. c. 2 Pr.	28 May 1714
An Act for vesting the Lease of the Rectory of Chesterfield, in the County of Derby, in Trustees, to be sold, for the Payment of the Debts of George Smyth Esquire, deceased, and for making Provision for his Daughter.
Hele's Estate Act 1713	13 Ann. c. 3 Pr.	28 May 1714
An Act for the Sale of the Manor and Barton of Widdicombe, in the County of Devon, comprized in the Marriage Settlement of Walter Hele Gentleman and Philippe his Wife; and for raising and securing the Sum of Fifteen Hundred Pounds, for the Benefit of the Children of the said Walter and Philippe.
Tregagle's Estate Act 1713	13 Ann. c. 4 Pr.	5 June 1714
An Act for Sale of the Estate of John Tregagle Esquire deceased, lying in the Counties of Devon and Cornwal, for Payment of Debts, and making Provision for his Children.
Manor of Cottingham or Cottingham Sarum (Yorkshire): partition between Richard Wynne and his wife Sarah and John Barrington.	13 Ann. c. 5 Pr.	5 June 1714
An Act to make Partition of the Manor of Cottingham, alias Cottingham Sarum, in the County of York, between Richard Wynne Esquire and Sarah his Wife, and John Barrington Esquire.
Kirchhoff's Naturalization Act 1713	13 Ann. c. 6 Pr.	5 June 1714
An Act for naturalizing Christian William Kirchhoff.
Tormarton Inclosure Act 1713	13 Ann. c. 7 Pr.	25 June 1714
An Act for parting and enclosing Two great Open Common Fields, and a large Open Greensward Common Down, lying and being in the Manor and Parish of Thormarton, alias Farmington, in the County of Gloucester; and for other Purposes therein mentioned.
Viscount Howe's Estate Act 1713	13 Ann. c. 8 Pr.	25 June 1714
An Act for the rendering valid and effectual Two several Indentures of Demise and Mortgage, executed by Scrope late Lord Viscount Howe in the Kingdom of Ireland, deceased, by Virtue of a former Act of Parliament (Note: Viscount Howe's Estate Act 1705 (4 & 5 Ann. c. 20 Pr.)) made for enabling him thereunto, notwithstanding some Defects therein.
Scroope's Estate Act 1713	13 Ann. c. 9 Pr.	25 June 1714
An Act for Sale of some Out Parts of the Estate of Simon Scrope Esquire, in the Counties of York and Nottingham, for Payment of his Debts; and for other Purposes therein mentioned.
Cherry's Estate Act 1713	13 Ann. c. 10 Pr.	25 June 1714
An Act for the Sale of certain Messuages, Lands, Tenements, and Hereditaments, contained in the Marriage Settlement of Francis Cherry Gentleman, deceased, and Elizabeth his Wife; and for the converting the same into Ready Money, for the Benefit of his Wife and Children; and for the Sale of divers other Manors, Messuages, Lands, Tenements, and Hereditaments, for the Payment of the Debts of the said Francis Cherry, and of the Debts of William Cherry Esquire, deceased, and other Purposes in the said Act mentioned.
Du Pree's Naturalization Act 1713	13 Ann. c. 11 Pr.	25 June 1714
An Act for naturalizing Samuel Dupree.
Lady Kingston's Estate Act 1713	13 Ann. c. 12 Pr.	9 July 1714
An Act to enable the Right Honourable Rachel Lady Kingston, an Infant, to make a Lease of Part of her Jointure Estate, notwithstanding her Infancy.
Earl of Bellomont's Estate Act 1713	13 Ann. c. 13 Pr.	9 July 1714
An Act to enable the Right Honourable Richard Earl of Bellomont to sell certain Lands in Ireland, for raising Money, to purchase the Jointure of Lucy Anne Countess Dowager of Bellomont, and for paying her Daughter's Portion.
Massereene's Estate Act 1713	13 Ann. c. 14 Pr.	9 July 1714
An Act for confirming a Settlement made on the Marriage of the now Lord Viscount Massereene; and for better securing the Jointure of his Lady, and of Rachel Viscountess Dowager Massereene; and for vesting in Trustees certain Lands and Tithes in Ireland, to be sold, for the Purposes therein mentioned.
Hamilton's Estate Act 1713	13 Ann. c. 15 Pr.	9 July 1714
An Act for vesting in Frederick Hamilton Esquire certain Lands and Hereditaments, in the Kingdom of Ireland, purchased by him of the Executors of Joseph Ivie Esquire, deceased; and for other Purposes therein mentioned.
Prendergast's Estate Act 1713	13 Ann. c. 16 Pr.	9 July 1714
An Act to enable Sir Thomas Prendergast Baronet, an Infant, to sell Part of his Estate, lying in the County of Waterford, in the Kingdom of Ireland, for the Payment of his Father's Debts, and other Purposes therein mentioned.
Empowering the Treasury to compound with Thomas Edwin for such debts as he stands bound for as surety for Thomas Coleman, tobacco merchant.	13 Ann. c. 17 Pr.	9 July 1714
An Act to empower the Lord High Treasurer of Great Britain, or Commissioners of the Treasury, for the Time being, to compound with Thomas Edwin, of London, Merchant, for such Debt as he stands bound for, as Surety for Thomas Coleman Tobacco Merchant.
Empowering the Treasury to compound with Robert Wise and his sureties for such debts as he owes to Her Majesty or stands bound for as surety for customs of tobacco.	13 Ann. c. 18 Pr.	9 July 1714
An Act to empower the Lord High Treasurer of Great Britain, or Commissioners of the Treasury, for the Time being, to compound with Robert Wise and his Sureties for such Debts as he owes to Her Majesty, or stands bound for as Surety, for Customs on Tobacco.
Loggin's Divorce Act 1713	13 Ann. c. 19 Pr.	9 July 1714
An Act for dissolving the Marriage of Francis Loggin with Sarah Gardner; and to enable him to marry again.
Enabling Ambrose Browne and others to sell the manor of Bayham in Sussex and Kent and to settle other lands in Surrey to the same uses.	13 Ann. c. 20 Pr.	9 July 1714
An Act to enable Ambrose Browne Esquire, and others, to make Sale of the Manor of Bayham, in the Counties of Sussex and Kent; and to settle other Lands and Tenements, in the County of Surrey, to the same Uses as the said Manor of Bayham now stands settled.
Brown's Estate Act 1713	13 Ann. c. 21 Pr.	9 July 1714
An Act for vesting Part of the Estate of William Brown, an Infant, lying in the Parishes of Bridgwater, Northpetherton, and Weston Zoyland, in the County of Somerset, in Trustees, to be sold, for Payment of a Mortgage, and other Debts and Legacies.
Bourchier's Estate Act 1713	13 Ann. c. 22 Pr.	9 July 1714
An Act for Sale of Part of the Estate late of Brereton Bourchier Esquire, deceased, for Payment of Debts, and other Purposes therein mentioned.
For making effectual an agreement between the Commissioners for Building Fifty New Churches and John Walker for ground in the Strand for one of the new churches.	13 Ann. c. 23 Pr.	9 July 1714
An Act for making effectual an Agreement made by the Commissioners for building Fifty new Churches, with John Walker Esquire, for Ground in The Strand, to build One of the new Churches (Note: St Mary le Strand) upon.
Eymer's Naturalization Act 1713	13 Ann. c. 24 Pr.	9 July 1714
An Act for naturalizing James Eymer and others.
Burr's Naturalization Act 1713	13 Ann. c. 25 Pr.	9 July 1714
An Act for naturalizing Daniel Burr.

=== Sources ===
- Raithby, John, ed. (1822). "Anno 13° Annæ, A.D. 1713". The Statutes of the Realm. Vol. 9: The Statutes of the Seventh to the Thirteenth Years of the Reign of Queen Anne. pp. 804–1005 – via Internet Archive.
- Raithby, John, ed. (1822). "Anno 13° Annæ, A.D. 1713". The Statutes of the Realm. Vol. 9: The Statutes of the Seventh to the Thirteenth Years of the Reign of Queen Anne. pp. 804–1005 – via HathiTrust.
- Pickering, Danby, ed. (1764). "Anno duodecimo Annæ. Stat. 2". The Statutes at Large. Vol. 13: From the Twelfth Year of Queen Anne to the Fifth Year of King George I. Cambridge: Joseph Bentham. pp. 59–130 – via Internet Archive.
- Pickering, Danby, ed. (1764). "Anno duodecimo Annæ. Stat. 2". The Statutes at Large. Vol. 13: From the Twelfth Year of Queen Anne to the Fifth Year of King George I. Cambridge: Joseph Bentham. pp. 59–130 – via Google Books.
- Pickering, Danby, ed. (1764). "Anno duodecimo Annæ. Stat. 2". The Statutes at Large. Vol. 13: From the Twelfth Year of Queen Anne to the Fifth Year of King George I. Cambridge: Joseph Bentham. pp. 59–130 – via Internet Archive.
- Pickering, Danby, ed. (1764). "Anno duodecimo Annæ. Stat. 2". The Statutes at Large. Vol. 13: From the Twelfth Year of Queen Anne to the Fifth Year of King George I. Cambridge: Joseph Bentham. pp. 59–130 – via Internet Archive.
- Journals of the House of Commons. Vol. 17. London: His Majesty's Stationery Office. 1803. pp. 471–724 – via Google Books.
- House of Lords Journal. Vol. 19. London: His Majesty's Stationery Office. 1830 [1767]. pp. 620–760 – via British History Online.
- Chronological Table of and Index to the Statutes. Vol. 1: To the End of the Session 59 Vict. Sess. 2 (1895) (13th ed.). London: Her Majesty's Stationery Office. 1896. p. 92 – via Google Books.

== See also ==
- List of acts of the Parliament of Great Britain
