= Religious Worship Act 1718 =

Act of the Parliament of Great Britain

- Act of Parliament
- Parliament of Great Britain
- Long title: An Act for strengthening the Protestant Interest in these Kingdoms.
- Citation: 5 Geo. 1. c. 4
- Territorial extent: Great Britain; Jersey; Guernsey; (Note: Section 2.)

Dates
- Royal assent: 18 February 1719
- Commencement: 11 November 1718 (Note: Start of session.)
- Repealed: 21 August 1871

Other legislation
- Amends: Occasional Conformity Act 1711
- Repeals/revokes: Established Church Act 1713
- Repealed by: Statute Law Revision Act 1871

Status: Repealed

Text of statute as originally enacted

The Religious Worship Act 1718 (5 Geo. 1. c. 4) was an act of the Parliament of Great Britain. It repealed the Established Church Act 1713 (13 Ann. c. 7) (Note: This is the citation in The Statutes of the Realm.).

== Subsequent developments ==
The whole act was repealed by section 1 of, and the schedule to, the Statute Law Revision Act 1871 (34 & 35 Vict. c. 116), which came into force on 21 August 1871.
