= Presentation of Benefices Act 1713 =

Act of the Parliament of Great Britain

Presentation of Benefices Act 1713 (Note: The citation of this act by this short title was authorised by section 1 of, and the first schedule to, the Short Titles Act 1896. Due to the repeal of those provisions it is now authorised by section 19(2) of the Interpretation Act 1978.)
- Act of Parliament
- Parliament of Great Britain
- Long title: An Act for rendring more effectual an Act made in the third Year of the Reign of King James the First, intituled, "An Act to prevent and avoid Dangers which may grow by Popish Recusants;" and also of one other Act made in the first Year of the Reign of their late Majesties King William and Queen Mary intituled, "An Act to vest in the two Universities the Presentations of Benefices belonging to Papists;" and for vesting in the Lords of Justiciary Power to inflict the same Punishments against Jesuits, Priests and other trafficking Papists, which the Privy Council of Scotland was impowered to do by an Act passed in the Parliament of Scotland, intituled, "An Act for preventing the Growth of Popery."
- Citation: 13 Ann. c. 13 (Note: This is the citation in The Statutes of the Realm.); 12 Ann. St. 2. c. 14 (Note: This is the citation in The Statutes at Large.)
- Territorial extent: Great Britain

Dates
- Royal assent: 9 July 1714
- Commencement: 10 July 1714 (Note: Section 1.)
- Repealed: 16 November 1989

Other legislation
- Amended by: Statute Law Revision Act 1867; Statute Law Revision Act 1887; Administration of Justice Act 1965
- Repealed by: Patronage (Benefices) Measure 1986; Statute Law (Repeals) Act 1989
- Relates to: Presentation of Benefices Act 1605; Popery Act 1700

Status: Repealed

Text of statute as originally enacted

The Presentation of Benefices Act 1713 (13 Ann. c. 13) was an act of the Parliament of Great Britain.

The act is chapter 14 in Ruffhead's Edition and 12 Ann Stat 2 c XIV in common printed editions.

== Subsequent developments ==
Section 12 of the act was repealed by section 1 of, and the schedule to, the Statute Law Revision Act 1867 (30 & 31 Vict. c. 59), which came into force on 15 July 1867.

The title, from "and for vesting" to end of title, was repealed by section 1 of, and the Schedule to, the Statute Law Revision Act 1887 (50 & 51 Vict. c. 59).

The whole act, except sections 9 and 11 was repealed by section 41(2) of, and schedule 5 to, the Patronage (Benefices) Measure 1986 (No 3), subject to section 40 of that Measure.

The remainder of the act (sections 9 and 11) was repealed by section 1(1) of, and part VIII of schedule 1 to, the Statute Law (Repeals) Act 1989, which came into force on 16 November 1989.
