= Schism Act 1714 =

Act of the Parliament of Great Britain

- Act of Parliament
- Parliament of Great Britain
- Long title: An Act to prevent the Growth of Schism, and for the further Security of the Churches of England and Ireland as by Law established.
- Citation: 13 Ann. c. 7 (Note: This is the citation in The Statutes of the Realm.); 12 Ann. St. 2. c. 7 (Note: This is the citation in The Statutes at Large.)
- Territorial extent: Great Britain

Dates
- Royal assent: 25 February 1714
- Commencement: 1 August 1714 (Note: Section 1.)
- Repealed: 11 November 1718
Other legislation
Repealed by	Religious Worship Act 1718
Relates to	Act of Uniformity 1662

Status: Repealed

Text of statute as originally enacted

The Schism Act 1714 (13 Ann. c. 7) , or the Established Church Act 1713, was an act of the Parliament of Great Britain which was repealed in 1718. The act, which was never-enforced, act stipulated that anyone who wished to keep (manage or own) a public or private school, or act as tutor, must first be granted a licence from a bishop. Also, he (or she) must conform to the liturgy of the Church of England and to have taken in the past year the rites of that Church.

The act sought to constrain, convert or curtail Dissenter schools (dissenting academies), but on the day the act was due to come into force, Queen Anne died, and the act was rarely enforced.

== Subsequent developments ==
Upon the Hanoverian succession in 1714 and the subsequent supremacy of Whigs, the whole act was repealed by section 1 of the Religious Worship Act 1718 (5 Geo. 1. c. 4), which came into force on 11 November 1718.
