= Declarator =

A declarator in Scottish law is a form of legal action by which some right of property, servitude, or status (or some other inferior right or interest) is sought to be judicially declared.
