= Stockjobber =

Former occupation

Stock Jobbing Act 1733
- Act of Parliament
- Parliament of Great Britain
- Long title: An Act to prevent the infamous Practice of Stockjobbing.
- Citation: 7 Geo. 2. c. 8
- Territorial extent: Great Britain

Dates
- Royal assent: 16 April 1734
- Commencement: 1 June 1734 (Note: Section 1.)
- Repealed: 14 June 1860
Other legislation
Amended by	Stock Jobbing Act 1736
Repealed by	Repeal of Sir John Barnard's Act 1860

Status: Repealed

Text of statute as originally enacted

Print of Robert Dighton's satirical drawing Stock-Jobbers or Gazette Extraordinary (published 1795), showing stock-jobbers reading an extraordinary edition of The London Gazette.

Stock Jobbing Act 1736
- Act of Parliament
- Parliament of Great Britain
- Long title: An Act to make perpetual an Act made in the Seventh Year of the Reign of His present Majesty, intituled, "An Act to prevent the infamous Practice of Stock-jobbing."
- Citation: 10 Geo. 2. c. 8
- Territorial extent: Great Britain

Dates
- Royal assent: 22 April 1737
- Commencement: 1 February 1737 (Note: Start of session.)
- Repealed: 14 June 1860
Other legislation
Amends	Stock Jobbing Act 1733
Repealed by	Repeal of Sir John Barnard's Act 1860

Status: Repealed

Text of statute as originally enacted

Repeal of Sir John Barnard's Act 1860
- Act of Parliament
- Parliament of the United Kingdom
- Long title: An Act to repeal the Act of the Seventh Year of King George the Second, Chapter Eight, commonly called "Sir John Barnard's Act," and the Act of the Tenth Year of King George the Second, Chapter Eight.
- Citation: 23 & 24 Vict. c. 28
- Territorial extent: United Kingdom

Dates
- Royal assent: 14 June 1860
- Commencement: 14 June 1860
- Repealed: 11 August 1875
Other legislation
Repeals/revokes	Stock Jobbing Act 1733; Stock Jobbing Act 1736
Repealed by	Statute Law Revision Act 1875

Status: Repealed

Text of statute as originally enacted

Stockjobbers were institutions that acted as market makers in the London Stock Exchange. The business of stockjobbing emerged in the 1690s during England's Financial Revolution. During the 18th century, the jobbers attracted numerous critiques from Thomas Mortimer, Daniel Defoe and others. These writers denounced the use of market manipulation and front running and regarded it as unethical that the jobbers made money without any interest in the stocks involved. The business survived repeated legislation to ban it and became institutionalised.

Prior to the "Big Bang" deregulation of 1986, every stock traded on the exchange passed through a 'jobber's book', that is, they acted as the ultimate purchasers of shares sold and the source of shares purchased, by stockbrokers on behalf of the latter's clients. In turn, stockbrokers were not permitted to be market makers.

In the final years of stockjobbing, the leading firms were Akroyd & Smithers, Wedd Durlacher, Pinchin Denny, Smith Brothers, Bisgood Bishop and Charles Pulley. All of these firms were acquired by investment banks and other financial institutions.

== Bibliography ==
- Pennecuik, Alexander (1721). An Ancient Prophecy Concerning Stock-jobbing, and the Conduct of the Directors of the South-Sea-Company. Edinburgh: John Mosman.
