= Vagrants Act 1713 =

Act of the Parliament of Great Britain

- Act of Parliament
- Parliament of Great Britain
- Long title: An Act for reducing the Laws relating to Rogues, Vagabonds, sturdy Beggars, and Vagrants, into One Act of Parliament; and for the more effectual punishing such Rogues, Vagabonds, sturdy Beggars, and Vagrants, and sending them whither they ought to be sent.
- Citation: 13 Ann. c. 26 (Note: This is the citation in The Statutes of the Realm.); 12 Ann. St. 2. c. 23 (Note: This is the citation in The Statutes at Large.)
- Territorial extent: Great Britain

Dates
- Royal assent: 9 July 1714
- Commencement: 16 February 1714 (Note: Start of session.)
- Repealed: 29 April 1740
Other legislation
| Repeals/revokes | See § Repealed enactments |
| Repealed by | Vagrants Act 1739 |

Status: Repealed

Text of statute as originally enacted

The Vagrants Act 1713 (13 Ann. c. 26) was an act of the Parliament of Great Britain that consolidated enactments related to rogues, vagabonds, sturdy beggars and vagrants.

== Provisions ==
=== Repealed enactments ===
Section 28 of the act repealed 3 enactments, listed in that section.

| Citation | Short title | Description | Extent of repeal |
|---|---|---|---|
| 39 Eliz. 1. c. 4 | Vagabonds Act 1597 | An Acte for punishment of Rogues, Vagabondes, & Sturdie Begghers. | The whole act. |
| 1 Jas. 1. c. 7 | Vagabonds Act 1603 | An Acte for the Continuance and Explanation of the Statute made in the 39 yeere of our late Queene Elizabeth, intituled "An Acte for Punishmente of Rogues Vagaboundes and Sturdie Beggers." | The whole act. |
| 7 Jas. 1. c. 4 | Vagabonds Act 1609 | An Act for the due execution of divers laws and statutes heretofore made against rogues, vagabonds and sturdy beggars, and other lewd and idle persons. | So much as relates to the privy search thereby directed to be made. |

== Subsequent developments ==
The whole act was repealed by section 36 of the Vagrants Act 1739 (13 Geo. 2. c. 24), which received royal assent on 29 April 1740.
