= Vagrants Act 1739 =

Act of the Parliament of Great Britain

- Act of Parliament
- Parliament of Great Britain
- Long title: An Act for amending and enforcing the Laws relating to Rogues, Vagabonds, and other idle and disorderly Persons, and for reducing the same into One Act of Parliament; and also for amending the Laws for erecting, providing, and regulating Houses of Correction.
- Citation: 13 Geo. 2. c. 24
- Territorial extent: Great Britain

Dates
- Royal assent: 29 April 1740
- Commencement: 15 November 1739 (Note: Start of session.)
- Repealed: 1 June 1744
Other legislation
| Repeals/revokes | See § Repealed enactments |
| Repealed by | Justices Commitment Act 1743 |

Status: Repealed

Text of statute as originally enacted

The Vagrants Act 1739 (13 Geo. 2. c. 24) was an act of the Parliament of Great Britain that consolidated enactments related to rogues, vagabonds and other idle and disorderly persons, and amended the law relating to houses of correction.

== Provisions ==
=== Repealed enactments ===
Section 36 of the act repealed 1 enactment, the Vagrants Act 1713.

| Citation | Short title | Description | Extent of repeal |
|---|---|---|---|
| 13 Ann. c. 26 | Vagrants Act 1713 | An Act for reducing the Laws relating to Rogues, Vagabonds, sturdy Beggars, and Vagrants, into One Act of Parliament; and for the more effectual punishing such Rogues, Vagabonds, sturdy Beggars, and Vagrants, and sending them whither they ought to be sent. | The whole act. |

== Subsequent developments ==
The whole act was repealed by section 34 of the Justices Commitment Act 1743 (17 Geo. 2. c. 5), which came into force on from 1 June 1744.
