= List of acts of the Parliament of Great Britain from 1736 =

This is a complete list of acts of the Parliament of Great Britain for the year 1736.

For acts passed until 1707, see the list of acts of the Parliament of England and the list of acts of the Parliament of Scotland. See also the list of acts of the Parliament of Ireland.

For acts passed from 1801 onwards, see the list of acts of the Parliament of the United Kingdom. For acts of the devolved parliaments and assemblies in the United Kingdom, see the list of acts of the Scottish Parliament, the list of acts of the Northern Ireland Assembly, and the list of acts and measures of Senedd Cymru; see also the list of acts of the Parliament of Northern Ireland.

The number shown after each act's title is its chapter number. Acts are cited using this number, preceded by the year(s) of the reign during which the relevant parliamentary session was held; thus the Union with Ireland Act 1800 is cited as "39 & 40 Geo. 3. c. 67", meaning the 67th act passed during the session that started in the 39th year of the reign of George III and which finished in the 40th year of that reign. Note that the modern convention is to use Arabic numerals in citations (thus "41 Geo. 3" rather than "41 Geo. III"). Acts of the last session of the Parliament of Great Britain and the first session of the Parliament of the United Kingdom are both cited as "41 Geo. 3".

Acts passed by the Parliament of Great Britain did not have a short title; however, some of these acts have subsequently been given a short title by acts of the Parliament of the United Kingdom (such as the Short Titles Act 1896).

Before the Acts of Parliament (Commencement) Act 1793 came into force on 8 April 1793, acts passed by the Parliament of Great Britain were deemed to have come into effect on the first day of the session in which they were passed. Because of this, the years given in the list below may in fact be the year before a particular act was passed.

== 10 Geo. 2 ==
The third session of the 8th Parliament of Great Britain, which met from 1 February 1737 until 21 June 1737.

This session was also traditionally cited as 10 G. 2.

=== Public acts ===
Short title	Citation	Royal assent
Long title
Taxation Act 1736 (repealed)	10 Geo. 2. c. 1	22 February 1737
An Act for continuing the Duties upon Malt, Mum, Cyder, and Perry, in that Part of Great Britain called England; and for granting to His Majesty certain Duties upon Malt, Mum, Cyder, and Perry, in that Part of Great Britain called Scotland, for the Service of the Year One Thousand Seven Hundred and Thirty-seven. (Repealed by Statute Law Revision Act 1867 (30 & 31 Vict. c. 59))
Mutiny Act 1736 (repealed)	10 Geo. 2. c. 2	21 March 1737
An Act for punishing Mutiny and Desertion; and for the better Payment of the Army and their Quarters. (Repealed by Statute Law Revision Act 1867 (30 & 31 Vict. c. 59))
Land Tax Act 1736 (repealed)	10 Geo. 2. c. 3	22 April 1737
An Act for granting an Aid to His Majesty, by a Land Tax, to be raised in Great Britain, for the Service of the Year One Thousand Seven Hundred and Thirty-seven. (Repealed by Statute Law Revision Act 1867 (30 & 31 Vict. c. 59))
Dunbar Beer Duties Act 1736 (repealed)	10 Geo. 2. c. 4	21 March 1737
An Act for continuing an Act passed in the Fifth Year of the Reign of His late Majesty King George the First, intituled, "An Act for laying a Duty of Two Pennies Scots, or One Sixth Part of a Penny Sterling, upon every Pint of Ale or Beer that shall be vended or sold within the Town of Dunbar, for improving and preserving the Harbour, and repairing the Town House, and building a School and other Public Buildings there, and for supplying the said Town with fresh Water." (Note: Dunbar Beer Duties Act 1718 (5 Geo. 1. c. 16)) (Repealed by Statute Law Revision Act 1948 (11 & 12 Geo. 6. c. 62))
Worcester Roads Act 1736 (repealed)	10 Geo. 2. c. 5	22 April 1737
An Act for enlarging the Term granted by an Act passed in the Twelfth Year of the Reign of His late Majesty King George the First, intituled, "An Act for repairing several Roads therein mentioned leading into the City of Worcester;" (Note: Worcester Roads Act 1725 (12 Geo. 1. c. 14)) and for repairing several other Roads lying contiguous to the same; and for reducing the Toll or Duties granted on Sheep and Lambs by the said Act. (Repealed by Worcester (City) Roads Act 1816 (56 Geo. 3. c. xlvi))
New Sarum Improvement Act 1736 (repealed)	10 Geo. 2. c. 6	22 April 1737
An Act for the better repairing and paving the Highways, Streets, and Water-courses, within the City of New Sarum; and for enlightening the Streets, Lanes, and Passages, and better regulating the Nightly Watch, within the said City. (Repealed by New Sarum Improvement Act 1815 (55 Geo. 3. c. xxiii))
Dumfries Beer Duties Act 1736 (repealed)	10 Geo. 2. c. 7	22 April 1737
An Act for continuing an Act passed in the Third Year of the Reign of His late Majesty King George the First, (Note: Dumfries Beer Duties Act 1716 (3 Geo. 1. c. 6)) for laying a Duty of Two Pennies Scots, or one Sixth Part of a Penny Sterling, on every Pint of Ale or Beer, that shall be vended or sold within the Town of Dumfries, and Privileges thereof, for paying the Debts of the said Town; and for building a Church, and making a Harbour there; and for laying a Duty on the Tonnage of Shipping, and a Duty on Goods imported and exported into and out of the Port of the said Town, for the better repairing of the said Harbour. (Repealed by Statute Law Revision Act 1948 (11 & 12 Geo. 6. c. 62))
Stock Jobbing Act 1736 (repealed)	10 Geo. 2. c. 8	22 April 1737
An Act to make perpetual an Act made in the Seventh Year of the Reign of His present Majesty, intituled, "An Act to prevent the infamous Practice of Stock-jobbing." (Note: Stock Jobbing Act 1733 (7 Geo. 2. c. 8)) (Repealed by Repeal of Sir John Barnard's Act 1860 (23 & 24 Vict. c. 28))
Worsley Brook Navigation Act 1736	10 Geo. 2. c. 9	22 April 1737
An Act for making navigable the River, or Brook, called Worsley Brook, from Worsley Mill, in the Township of Worsley, in the County Palatine of Lancaster, to the River Irwell, in the said County.
Aylesbury Gaol and Shire Hall (Rate in Buckinghamshire) Act 1736 or the Aylesbury Gaol and Shire Hall Rate in Bucks Act 1736 (repealed)	10 Geo. 2. c. 10	22 April 1737
An Act to empower the Justices of the Peace for the County of Bucks to raise Money, to discharge the Debts incurred on account of building a Gaol and Court Rooms; and for finishing the same, for the Use of the County. (Repealed by Statute Law (Repeals) Act 2008 (c. 12))
Old Stratford to Dunchurch Road Act 1736 (repealed)	10 Geo. 2. c. 11	22 April 1737
An Act for making more effectual Two Acts of Parliament; one, of the Sixth Year of the Reign of Her late Majesty Queen Anne; (Note: Old Stratford to Dunchurch Road Act 1707 (6 Ann. c. 77)) and the other, of the Eleventh Year of the Reign of His late Majesty King George; (Note: Old Stratford to Dunchurch Road Act 1724 (11 Geo. 1. c. 25)) for repairing the Highways from Old Stratford, in the County of Northampton, to Dunchurch, in the County of Warwick. (Repealed by Old Stratford to Dunchurch Road Act 1775 (15 Geo. 3. c. 73))
Southampton Roads Act 1736 (repealed)	10 Geo. 2. c. 12	21 June 1737
An Act for repairing the Road from Hertford Bridge Hill, to the Town of Basingstoke; and also the Road from Hertford Bridge Hill aforesaid, to the Town of Odiham, in the County of Southampton. (Repealed by Bagshot and Basingstoke and Odiham Roads Act 1819 (59 Geo. 3. c. vii))
Indemnity Act 1736 (repealed)	10 Geo. 2. c. 13	21 June 1737
An Act for indemnifying Persons who have omitted to qualify themselves for Offices, or to take the Oaths required, within the Time limited by Law; and for allowing further Time for those Purposes. (Repealed by Statute Law Revision Act 1867 (30 & 31 Vict. c. 59))
Relief of Shipwrecked Mariners Act 1736 (repealed)	10 Geo. 2. c. 14	21 June 1737
An Act for collecting, at the Port of Leghorn, certain small Sums of Money, to which the Merchants trading there have usually contributed, for the Relief of shipwrecked Mariners, Captives, and other distressed Persons, His Majesty's Subjects; and for other charitable and public Uses. (Repealed by Consular Advances Act 1825 (6 Geo. 4. c. 87))
Saint Andrew, Holborn-above-bars (Watching, etc.) Act 1736 (repealed)	10 Geo. 2. c. 15	21 June 1737
An Act to enable the present and future Proprietors and Inhabitants of the Houses in Red Lyon Square, in the County of Middlesex, to make a Rate on themselves, for raising Money sufficient to enclose, pave, watch, clean, and adorn, the said Square. (Repealed by London Government (Borough of Holborn) Order in Council 1901 (SR&O 1901/269))
Westminster Bridge Act 1736 (repealed)	10 Geo. 2. c. 16	21 June 1737
An Act for explaining and amending an Act passed in the Ninth Year of the Reign of His present Majesty, intituled, "An Act for building a Bridge cross the River Thames, from The New Palace Yard, in the City of Westminster, to the opposite Shore, in the County of Surrey." (Note: Westminster Bridge Act 1735 (9 Geo. 2. c. 29)) (Repealed by Westminster Bridge Act 1853 (16 & 17 Vict. c. 46))
National Debt Act 1736 (repealed)	10 Geo. 2. c. 17	21 June 1737
An Act for repealing the present Duty on Sweets, and for granting a less Duty thereupon; and for explaining and enforcing the Execution of an Act passed in the Ninth Year of His present Majesty's Reign, intituled, "An Act for laying a Duty upon the Retailers of Spirituous Liquors, and for licensing the Retailers thereof;" (Note: Spirit Duties Act 1735 (9 Geo. 2. c. 23)) and for appropriating the Supplies granted in this Session of Parliament; and for making forth Duplicates of Exchequer Bills, Lottery Tickets, and Orders, lost, burnt, or otherwise destroyed. (Repealed by Statute Law Revision Act 1870 (33 & 34 Vict. c. 69))
Church of Saint Olave, Southwark Act 1736 (repealed)	10 Geo. 2. c. 18	21 June 1737
An Act for re-building the Church of the Parish of St. Olave, in the City of London, and in the Borough of Southwark, in the County of Surrey. (Repealed by Statute Law (Repeals) Act 2013 (c. 2))
Plays and Wine Licences Act 1736 (repealed)	10 Geo. 2. c. 19	21 June 1737
An Act for the more effectual preventing the unlawful playing of Interludes within the Precincts of the Two Universities, in that Part of Great Britain called England, and the Places adjacent; and for explaining and amending so much of an Act passed in the last Session of Parliament, intituled, "An Act for laying a Duty upon the Retailers of Spirituous Liquors, and for licensing the Retailers thereof," as may affect the Privilege of the said Universities, with respect to licensing Taverns and all other Public Houses within the Precincts of the same. (Repealed by Statute Law (Repeals) Act 1978 (c. 45))
River Clyde Bridge, Lanark Act 1736 (repealed)	10 Geo. 2. c. 20	21 June 1737
An Act to enable the Magistrates and Town Council of the Borough of Lanark to repair and maintain their Bridge over the River Clyd, at Clydsholm, in the Shire of Lanark. (Repealed by Statute Law Revision Act 1948 (11 & 12 Geo. 6. c. 62))
Church of Abthorpe and Foxcoate, Northants Act 1736	10 Geo. 2. c. 21	21 June 1737
An Act for the making the Chapel in the Hamlet of Abthorpe and Foxcoate, in the Parish of Towcester, in the County of Northampton, a Parish Church; and for appointing a District or Parish thereto; and for enabling the Master of the Free Grammar School, within the said Hamlet of Abthorpe and Foxcoate, to be Vicar of the said Parish Church.
Watching (City of London) Act 1736 (repealed)	10 Geo. 2. c. 22	21 June 1737
An Act for the better regulating the Nightly Watch and Beadles, within the City of London and Liberties thereof; and for making more effectual the Laws now in being, for paving and cleansing the Streets and Sewers in and about the said City. (Repealed by City of London Police Act 1839 (2 & 3 Vict. c. xciv))
Surrey and Sussex Roads Act 1736 (repealed)	10 Geo. 2. c. 23	21 June 1737
An Act for explaining and amending and making more effectual several Acts of Parliament, made in the Fourth, (Note: London, East Grinstead, Sutton and Kingston Roads Act 1717 (4 Geo. 1. c. 4 Pr.)) Sixth, (Note: Surrey and Kent Roads Act 1719 (6 Geo. 1. c. 26)) and Tenth (Note: Surrey and Sussex Roads Act 1723 (10 Geo. 1. c. 13)) Years of the Reign of His late Majesty King George the First, respectively, for repairing the several Roads therein mentioned, in the Counties of Surrey, Kent, and Sussex; and for enlarging the Terms and Powers by the said Acts granted; and for repairing the Road lying between Nonesuch and Worcester Parks, in the Parish of Cuddington, in the said County of Surrey. (Repealed by Statute Law (Repeals) Act 2013 (c. 2))
Bedfordshire Roads Act 1736 (repealed)	10 Geo. 2. c. 24	21 June 1737
An Act for enlarging the Term and Powers granted by an Act passed in the Ninth Year of the Reign of His late Majesty King George the First, intituled, "An Act for repairing and widening the Road leading from The Black Bull Inn, in Dunstable, in the County of Bedford, to the Way turning out of the said Road up to Shafford House, in the County of Hertford;" (Note: Dunstable Roads Act 1722 (9 Geo. 1. c. 11)) and for preventing the driving of Cattle through private Grounds and Passages, to avoid the Payment of the Toll charged upon Cattle by an Act of the First Year of the Reign of His late Majesty, (Note: Hertford and Middlesex Highways Act 1715 (1 Geo. 1. St. 2. c. 12 Pr.)) and the Eighth Year of the Reign of His present Majesty, (Note: Hertfordshire and Middlesex Roads Act 1734 (8 Geo. 2. c. 9)) for repairing the Roads from South Mims to St. Albans, in the said County of Hertford. (Repealed by Bedford and Hertford Roads Act 1786 (26 Geo. 3. c. 130))
Watching (Holborn) Act 1736 (repealed)	10 Geo. 2. c. 25	21 June 1737
An Act for the better regulating the Nightly Watch and Beadles, within the Liberty of Saffron Hill, Hatton Garden, and Ely Rents, in the Parish of St. Andrew, Holborn, in the County of Middlesex. (Repealed by %[%[London Government (Borough of Holborn) Order in Council 1901]] (SR&O [[List of statutory rules and orders of the United Kingdom#19011901%]%]/269))
Insolvent Debtors Relief Act 1736 (repealed)	10 Geo. 2. c. 26	21 June 1737
An Act for Relief of Insolvent Debtors. (Repealed by Statute Law Revision Act 1867 (30 & 31 Vict. c. 59))
Customs, etc. Act 1736 (repealed)	10 Geo. 2. c. 27	21 June 1737
An Act for laying a Duty upon Apples imported from Foreign Parts; and for continuing an Act passed in the Fourth Year of the Reign of His present Majesty, (Note: Exportation Act 1730 (4 Geo. 2. c. 29)) for granting an Allowance upon the Exportation of British-made Gunpowder; and for taking off the Drawback upon Exportation of Foreign Paper; and for the better securing the Payment of the Bounty on the Exportation of British-made Sail Cloth; and for giving further Time for the Payment of Duties omitted to be paid for the Indentures and Contracts of Clerks and Apprentices. (Repealed by Statute Law Revision Act 1867 (30 & 31 Vict. c. 59))
Licensing Act 1737 or the Plays Act 1736 or the Theatrical Licensing Act 1737 or the Stage Licensing Act 1737 (repealed)	10 Geo. 2. c. 28	21 June 1737
An Act to explain and amend so much of an Act made in the Twelfth Year of the Reign of Queen Anne, intituled, "An Act for reducing the Laws relating to Rogues, Vagabonds, sturdy Beggars, and Vagrants, into One Act of Parliament; and for the more effectual punishing such Rogues, Vagabonds, sturdy Beggars, and Vagrants, and sending them whither they ought to be sent," (Note: Vagrants Act 1713 (13 Ann. c. 26)) as relates to common Players of Interludes. (Repealed by Birmingham Theatre Act 1807 (47 Geo. 3. Sess. 2. c. xliv) and Theatres Act 1843 (6 & 7 Vict. c. 68))
Prince and Princess of Wales Act 1736 (repealed)	10 Geo. 2. c. 29	21 June 1737
An Act for enabling His Majesty to settle a Revenue, for supporting the Dignity of her Royal Highness the Princess, in case she shall survive his Royal Highness the Prince of Wales; and for exempting such Yearly Sum or Sums of Money as His Majesty hath granted, or shall grant, to his said Royal Highness, from the Payment of Fees, Taxes, and other Charges whatsoever; and for enabling his said Royal Highness to make Leases of Lands, Parcel of the Dutchy of Cornwall, or annexed to the same. (Repealed by Statute Law Revision Act 1867 (30 & 31 Vict. c. 59))
Customs Act 1736 (repealed)	10 Geo. 2. c. 30	21 June 1737
An Act for repealing the Duties payable ad Valorem upon Foreign Oysters imported into this Kingdom; and for laying another Duty thereon. (Repealed by Statute Law Revision Act 1867 (30 & 31 Vict. c. 59))
Thames Watermen Act 1736 (repealed)	10 Geo. 2. c. 31	21 June 1737
An Act for regulating the Company of Watermen, Wherrymen, and Lightermen, rowing on the River Thames, between Gravesend, in the County of Kent, and Windsor, in the County of Berks. (Repealed by Thames Watermen and Lightermen Act 1827 (7 & 8 Geo. 4. c. lxxv))
Offences Against Persons and Property Act 1736 (repealed)	10 Geo. 2. c. 32	21 June 1737
An Act for continuing an Act for the more effectual punishing wicked and evil-disposed Persons going armed and disguised, and doing Injuries and Violences to the Persons and Properties of His Majesty's Subjects, and for the more speedy bringing the Offenders to Justice; and for continuing Two Clauses, to prevent the cutting or breaking down the Bank of any River or Sea Bank, and to prevent the malicious cutting of Hop-binds, contained in an Act passed in the Sixth Year of His present Majesty's Reign; and for the more effectual Punishment of Persons removing any Materials used for securing Marsh or Sea Walls or Banks; and of Persons maliciously setting on Fire any Mine, Pit, or Delph, of Coal, or Cannel Coal; and of Persons unlawfully hunting, or taking any Red or Fallow Deer, in Forests or Chases; or beating or wounding Keepers or other Officers in Forests, Chases, or Parks; and for more effectually securing the Breed of Wild Fowl. (Repealed by Game Act 1831 (1 & 2 Will. 4. c. 32))
Roding Navigation Act 1736 or the Roden (Roding) Navigation Act 1736 (repealed)	10 Geo. 2. c. 33	21 June 1737
An Act for making navigable the River Rodon, from a little below a Mill called Barking Mill, in the County of Essex, to Illford Bridge, in the said County. (Repealed by %[%[Barking Barrage Order 1995]] (S.I. [[List of statutory instruments of the United Kingdom, 19951995%]%]/519))
Alexander Wilson (Provost of Edinburgh) Act 1736 (repealed)	10 Geo. 2. c. 34	21 June 1737
An Act to disable Alexander Wilson Esquire from taking, holding, or enjoying, any Office or Place of Magistracy, in the City of Edinburgh, or elsewhere in Great Britain; and for imposing a Fine upon the Corporation of the said City. (Repealed by Statute Law Revision Act 1948 (11 & 12 Geo. 6. c. 62))
Murderers of Captain Porteous Act 1736 (repealed)	10 Geo. 2. c. 35	21 June 1737
An Act for the more effectual bringing to Justice any Persons concerned in the barbarous Murder of Captain John Porteous, and punishing such as shall knowingly conceal any of the said Offenders. (Repealed by Statute Law Revision Act 1867 (30 & 31 Vict. c. 59))
Whitechapel Roads Act 1736 (repealed)	10 Geo. 2. c. 36	21 June 1737
An Act for enlarging the Term and Powers granted by an Act passed in the Eighth Year of the Reign of His late Majesty King George the First, (Note: Whitechapel Highways Act 1721 (8 Geo. 1. c. 30)) for repairing the Highways from The Stones End, at Whitechapel Church, in the County of Middlesex, to Shenfield, and to the furthermost Part of the Parish of Woodford, leading to the Town of Epping, in the County of Essex; and for repairing the Road leading from the Causeway in the Parish of Low Layton, through Wanstead, to the End of the Parish of Woodford next to the Parish of Chigwell, in the said County of Essex. (Repealed by St. Mary, Whitechapel Roads Act 1772 (12 Geo. 3 c. 102))
Richard Norton's Will Act 1736 (repealed)	10 Geo. 2. c. 37	21 June 1737
An Act to prevent the Act made in the Twenty-first Year of the Reign of King James the First, intituled, "An Act for Limitation of Actions, and for avoiding Suits in Law," (Note: Limitation Act 1623 (21 Jas. 1. c. 16)) being pleaded, insisted on, or taken Advantage of, by any Persons claiming under the last Will of Richard Norton Esquire, of Southwick, deceased, against any Claim, Title, or Demand, which Thomas Norton Esquire hath to or upon the Manor of Old Alresford, and Lands in the County of Southampton, settled by Indenture of the Fifth of March One Thousand Six Hundred and Fifty-seven, or the Rents and Profits thereof. (Repealed by Statute Law (Repeals) Act 1977 (c. 18))

=== Private acts ===
Short title	Citation	Royal assent
Long title
James's Name Act 1736	10 Geo. 2. c. 1 Pr.	21 March 1737
n Act to enable Anthony James Esquire, and his Heirs Male, and other Persons therein mentioned, to take and use the Surname of Keck, pursuant to the Will of Anthony Keck Gentleman, deceased.
Pouchon's Naturalization Act 1736	10 Geo. 2. c. 2 Pr.	21 March 1737
An Act for naturalizing Joseph Pouchon.
Naturalization of Nicholas Magens, John Timmerman and Theodore Davell.	10 Geo. 2. c. 3 Pr.	21 March 1737
An Act for naturalizing Nicholas Magens, John Timmerman, and Theodore Davel.
Sale of the capital messuage of Gunnersbury and other lands and hereditaments late the estate of Sir John Maynard and purchase of other estates to be settled to the uses of his will.	10 Geo. 2. c. 4 Pr.	22 April 1737
An Act for Sale of the Capital Messuage of Gunnersbury, and other Lands and Hereditaments, late the Estate of Sir John Maynard Knight, Serjeant at Law; and for purchasing another Estate, to be settled to the Uses of his Will.
Cook's Estate Act 1736	10 Geo. 2. c. 5 Pr.	22 April 1737
An Act for Sale of a certain Leasehold Estate of Thomas Cooke Esquire, in the County of Glocester; and for settling some Freehold and Copyhold Estates of Inheritance, of greater Value, to the same Uses, in Lieu thereof.
Hesketh's Estate Act 1736	10 Geo. 2. c. 6 Pr.	22 April 1737
An Act to enable the Trustees and Testamentary Guardians named in the Will of Thomas Hesketh, late of Rufford, in the County of Lancaster, Esquire, deceased, to perform the same, and make Leases for Lives in his settled Estate, for paying his Debts during his Sons Minority, in Ease of an Estate devised by him to be sold.
Purton Inclosure Act 1736	10 Geo. 2. c. 7 Pr.	22 April 1737
An Act for enclosing and dividing certain Common Pasture Grounds, called Purton Common and Purton Stoake Common, within the Parish of Purton, otherwise Puriton, in the County of Wilts.
Bouverie's Name Act 1736	10 Geo. 2. c. 8 Pr.	22 April 1737
An Act for enabling Sir Jacob Des Bouverie Baronet, and John Des Bouverie Esquire, and their respective Issue, and Elizabeth Des Bouverie Sister of the said John, to take and use the Surname of Bouverie, pursuant to the Desire of Jacob Des Bouverie Esquire, and Sir Christopher Des Bouverie, deceased.
Harvey's Name Act 1736	10 Geo. 2. c. 9 Pr.	22 April 1737
An Act to enable John Harvey Esquire, now called John Thursby, to take and use the Surname and Arms of Thursby, in Pursuance of the Will of William Thursby Esquire, deceased.
Kellow's Estate Act 1736	10 Geo. 2. c. 10 Pr.	22 April 1737
An Act to enable the Trustees in the Will of Thomas Kellow Gentleman, deceased, to sell the Rectory Impropriate of Berwick St. James, in the County of Wilts, for the Payment of his Debts.
Talbot's Estate Act 1736	10 Geo. 2. c. 11 Pr.	22 April 1737
An Act to enable Trustees, during the respective Minorities of George Talbot Esquire and his Younger Brothers, to grant Leases of the Estates of the said Infants, in the Counties of Salop, Worcester, Berks, Chester, Stafford, Oxford, and Wilts.
Thomas Pitt's Estate Act 1736	10 Geo. 2. c. 12 Pr.	22 April 1737
An Act for Sale of the Manor and Capital Messuage of Swallowfield, late the Estate of Thomas Pitt Esquire, deceased; and for purchasing another Estate, to be settled to the Uses of his Will.
Naturalization of Godfrey Wichelhausen, John Noppe, John Masson, Thomas Barbaud and John Dillman Act 1736	10 Geo. 2. c. 13 Pr.	22 April 1737
An Act for naturalizing Godfrey Wichelhausen, John Francis Noppe, John Stephen Masson, Thomas Barband, and John Dillman.
Earl of Winchelsea and Nottingham's Estate Act 1736	10 Geo. 2. c. 14 Pr.	21 June 1737
An Act for Sale of Part of the Estate of Daniel late Earl of Winchilsea and Nottingham, deceased, for Payment of Debts and Encumbrances charged upon and affecting the same; and for other Purposes therein mentioned.
Furnese's Estate Act 1736	10 Geo. 2. c. 15 Pr.	21 June 1737
An Act for establishing and confirming a Partition of the Estates of Sir Robert Furnese Baronet, deceased, among his Three Daughters and Coheirs; and for settling their several specific Shares and Allotments to such Uses as their several undivided Third Parts thereof stood limited before such Partition; and for other Purposes therein mentioned.
Enrolling certain indentures of lease and release executed by Sir William and Dame Elizabeth Dudley, and making the exemplification and attested copies and an Act of Parliament and articles of agreements therein referred to, evidence in all Irish courts.	10 Geo. 2. c. 16 Pr.	21 June 1737
An Act for enroling of certain Indentures of Lease and Release, executed by Sir William Dudley and Dame Elizabeth his Wife; and for making the Exemplification and attested Copies of such Indentures, and also of an Act of Parliament and certain Articles of Agreement therein referred to, Evidence in all Courts of Law and Equity in Ireland.
Graham's Estate Act 1736	10 Geo. 2. c. 17 Pr.	21 June 1737
An Act for Sale of the Manor of Kippax, in the County of York, Part of the settled Estate of Sir Reginald Graham Baronet; and for settling his Estates at Norton and Nunwick, in the same County, being of greater Value, to the same Uses; and for making a Partition of the Manor of Whitwell, between him and his Brother Richard Graham Esquire.
Establishing an agreement made by devisees of Sir Samuel Ongley with Sir Roger Hudson for sale of two messuages in Bishopsgate Street, London and purchasing two messuages in Threadneedle Street, London with the proceeds.	10 Geo. 2. c. 18 Pr.	21 June 1737
An Act to establish an Agreement, made by the Devisees of Sir Samuel Ongley Knight, deceased, with Sir Roger Hudson Knight, for the Sale of Two Messuages, on the East Side of Bishopgate Street, in the City of London; and for the Purchase of Two Messuages on the North Side of Threadneedle Street, in the said City, with Part of the Money arising from the said Sale; and for other Purposes therein mentioned.
Confirming an agreement between the rector and united parishes of Saint Mary Woolnoth and Saint Mary Woolchurch, London and the mayor, commonality and citizens of London for a grant of a parcel of ground in Stocks Market to the said mayor, commonality and citizens, in consideration of a yearly rent of £10 to the rector and his successors.	10 Geo. 2. c. 19 Pr.	21 June 1737
An Act for confirming an Agreement between the Rector of the Parish Church of St. Mary Woolnoth, and of the united Parishes of St. Mary Woolnoth and St. Mary Woolchurch, in the City of London, and the Mayor, Commonalty, and Citizens, of the said City, with the Consent of the Patron and Ordinary, for the Grant of a Parcel of Ground therein mentioned, lying in Stocks Market, to the said Mayor, Commonalty, and Citizens, in Consideration of a Rent of Ten Pounds a Year, payable to the said Rector and his Successors for ever.
Enabling Peter Legh to revoke or alter some of the uses and estates limited in a settlement formerly made by him, and to empower certain tenants for life to make jointures and provisions for daughters and younger sons in his lifetime.	10 Geo. 2. c. 20 Pr.	21 June 1737
An Act to enable Peter Legh, of Lyme, Esquire, to revoke or alter some of the Uses and Estates limited in a Settlement formerly made by him; and to empower certain Tenants for Life therein to make Jointures and Provision for Daughters and Younger Sons, in the Life-time of the said Peter Legh the Elder, and with his Consent.
Shakerley's Estate Act 1736	10 Geo. 2. c. 21 Pr.	21 June 1737
An Act to enable Peter Shakerley and George Shakerly, Sons of George Shakerley Esquire, to make suitable Jointures for their Wives, and Provision for their Daughters and Younger Sons, out of the Estates of the said George Shakerley the Father, lying in the Counties of Chester and Lancaster.
Swymmer's Estate Act 1736	10 Geo. 2. c. 22 Pr.	21 June 1737
An Act to enable the Guardians of Anthony Langley Swymmer, an Infant, to join in making Leases of certain Mines, in the County of Flint, with the other Owners thereof, during the Minority of the said Infant.
Trench's Estate Act 1736	10 Geo. 2. c. 23 Pr.	21 June 1737
An Act to vest the Estates of Frederick Trench Esquire, in the Counties of Westmeath and Meath, in the Kingdom of Ireland, in Trustees, to raise Money for the Payment of Debts; and, after discharging the said Debts, to the Use of the said Frederick Trench and his Heirs; and for settling other Lands therein mentioned, to the Uses of his Marriage Settlement.
Cary's Estate Act 1736	10 Geo. 2. c. 24 Pr.	21 June 1737
An Act for Sale of Part of the settled Estate of George Cary Esquire, lying in the County of Devon, for discharging several Debts and Encumbrances of his late Father and Grandfather; and for settling an Estate in the County of Middlesex to the Uses of his Marriage Settlement.
Restitution of George Seton Act 1736	10 Geo. 2. c. 25 Pr.	21 June 1737
An Act to enable George Seton, of Barnes, to sue, or maintain any Action or Suit, notwithstanding his Attainder; and to remove any Disability in him, by reason of his said Attainder, to take or inherit any Real or Personal Estate that may or shall hereafter descend or come to him.
Restitution of James Rollo Act 1736	10 Geo. 2. c. 26 Pr.	21 June 1737
An Act to enable James Rollow, only Son of Robert Rollow, late of Powhouse, deceased, to sue, or maintain any Action or Suit, notwithstanding his Attainder; and to remove any Disability in him, by Reason of his said Attainder, to take or inherit any Real or Personal Estate that may or shall hereafter descend or come to him.
Restitution of Jorden Langdale Act 1736	10 Geo. 2. c. 27 Pr.	21 June 1737
An Act to enable Jordan Langdale, of Cliff, in the County of York, to sue, or maintain any Action or Suit, notwithstanding his Outlawry; and to remove any Disability in him, by reason of his said Outlawry, to take or inherit any Real or Personal Estate that may or shall hereafter descend or come to him, and also such Real Estate as he was entitled unto, in Reversion or Remainder, before his said Outlawry.
Stallingborough Inclosure Act 1736	10 Geo. 2. c. 28 Pr.	21 June 1737
An Act for dividing and enclosing certain Open and Common Fields, within the Lordship and Parish of Stallingborough, in the County of Lincoln.
Mountfort's Name Act 1736	10 Geo. 2. c. 29 Pr.	21 June 1737
An Act to enable Edward Mountfort, and his Issue Male by Mary his now Wife, to take and use the Surname of Grosvenor.
Naturalization of Bartholomew Barratty, Bartholomew Gallatin, Francis Perrier and James Solier Act 1736	10 Geo. 2. c. 30 Pr.	21 June 1737
An Act for naturalizing Bartholomew Gallatin, Francis Perrier, and James Solier.

=== Sources ===
- Pickering, Danby, ed. (1765). "Anno decimo Georgii II". The Statutes at Large. Vol. 17: From the Ninth to the 15th Year of King George II. Cambridge: Joseph Bentham. pp. 89–169 – via Internet Archive.
- Pickering, Danby, ed. (1765). "Anno decimo Georgii II". The Statutes at Large. Vol. 17: From the Ninth to the 15th Year of King George II. Cambridge: Joseph Bentham. pp. 89–169 – via Google Books.
- Journals of the House of Commons. Vol. 22. London: His Majesty's Stationery Office. 1803. pp. 720–903 – via Google Books.
- Chronological Table of and Index to the Statutes. Vol. 1: To the End of the Session 59 Vict. Sess. 2 (1895) (13th ed.). London: Her Majesty's Stationery Office. 1896. p. 104 – via Google Books.

== See also ==
- List of acts of the Parliament of Great Britain
