= List of acts of the Parliament of Great Britain from 1739 =

This is a complete list of acts of the Parliament of Great Britain for the year 1739.

For acts passed until 1707, see the list of acts of the Parliament of England and the list of acts of the Parliament of Scotland. See also the list of acts of the Parliament of Ireland.

For acts passed from 1801 onwards, see the list of acts of the Parliament of the United Kingdom. For acts of the devolved parliaments and assemblies in the United Kingdom, see the list of acts of the Scottish Parliament, the list of acts of the Northern Ireland Assembly, and the list of acts and measures of Senedd Cymru; see also the list of acts of the Parliament of Northern Ireland.

The number shown after each act's title is its chapter number. Acts are cited using this number, preceded by the year(s) of the reign during which the relevant parliamentary session was held; thus the Union with Ireland Act 1800 is cited as "39 & 40 Geo. 3. c. 67", meaning the 67th act passed during the session that started in the 39th year of the reign of George III and which finished in the 40th year of that reign. Note that the modern convention is to use Arabic numerals in citations (thus "41 Geo. 3" rather than "41 Geo. III"). Acts of the last session of the Parliament of Great Britain and the first session of the Parliament of the United Kingdom are both cited as "41 Geo. 3".

Acts passed by the Parliament of Great Britain did not have a short title; however, some of these acts have subsequently been given a short title by acts of the Parliament of the United Kingdom (such as the Short Titles Act 1896).

Before the Acts of Parliament (Commencement) Act 1793 came into force on 8 April 1793, acts passed by the Parliament of Great Britain were deemed to have come into effect on the first day of the session in which they were passed. Because of this, the years given in the list below may in fact be the year before a particular act was passed.

== 13 Geo. 2 ==
The sixth session of the 8th Parliament of Great Britain, which met from 15 November 1739 until 29 April 1740.

This session was also traditionally cited as 13 G. 2.

=== Public acts ===
Short title	Citation	Royal assent
Long title
Taxation Act 1739 (repealed)	13 Geo. 2. c. 1	20 December 1739
An Act for continuing the Duties upon Malt, Mum, Cyder, and Perry, in that Part of Great Britain called England; and for granting to His Majesty certain Duties upon Malt, Mum, Cyder, and Perry, in that Part of Great Britain called Scotland, for the Service of the Year One Thousand Seven Hundred and Forty. (Repealed by Statute Law Revision Act 1867 (30 & 31 Vict. c. 59))
Land Tax Act 1739 (repealed)	13 Geo. 2. c. 2	20 December 1739
An Act for granting an Aid to His Majesty, by a Land Tax, to be raised in Great Britain, for the Service of the Year One Thousand Seven Hundred and Forty. (Repealed by Statute Law Revision Act 1867 (30 & 31 Vict. c. 59))
Supply of Seamen Act 1739 (repealed)	13 Geo. 2. c. 3	20 December 1739
An Act for the better Supply of Mariners and Seamen, to serve in His Majesty's Ships of War, and on board Merchant Ships, and other Trading Ships and Privateers. (Repealed by Statute Law Revision Act 1867 (30 & 31 Vict. c. 59))
Naval Prize Act 1739 (repealed)	13 Geo. 2. c. 4	19 March 1740
An Act for the more effectual securing and encouraging the Trade of His Majesty's British Subjects to America; and for the Encouragement of Seamen to enter into His Majesty's Service. (Repealed by Naval Prize Acts Repeal Act 1864 (27 & 28 Vict. c. 23))
Old Stratford to Dunchurch Road Act 1739 (repealed)	13 Geo. 2. c. 5	19 March 1740
An Act for making more effectual Three Acts of Parliament; One, of the Sixth Year of the Reign of Her late Majesty Queen Anne; (Note: Old Stratford to Dunchurch Road Act 1707 (6 Ann. c. 77)) and another, of the Eleventh Year of the Reign of His late Majesty King George, (Note: Old Stratford to Dunchurch Road Act 1724 (11 Geo. 1. c. 25)) for repairing the Highways from Old Stratford, in the County of Northampton, to Dunchurch, in the County of Warwick; and the Third, made in the Tenth Year of His present Majesty's Reign, (Note: Old Stratford to Dunchurch Road Act 1736 (10 Geo. 2. c. 11)) for making more effectual the said Two former Acts. (Repealed by Old Stratford to Dunchurch Road Act 1775 (15 Geo. 3 c. 73))
Indemnity Act 1739 (repealed)	13 Geo. 2. c. 6	19 March 1740
An Act to indemnify Persons who have omitted to qualify themselves for Offices and Employments within the Time limited by Law; and for allowing further Time for that Purpose. (Repealed by Statute Law Revision Act 1867 (30 & 31 Vict. c. 59))
Naturalization Act 1739 or the Plantation Act 1740 (repealed)	13 Geo. 2. c. 7	19 March 1740
An Act for naturalizing such Foreign Protestants, and others therein mentioned, as are settled, or shall settle, in any of His Majesty's Colonies in America. (Repealed by Naturalization Act 1870 (33 & 34 Vict. c. 14))
Frauds of Workmen Act 1739 (repealed)	13 Geo. 2. c. 8	19 March 1740
An Act to explain and amend an Act made in the First Year of the Reign of Her late Majesty Queen Anne, intituled, "An Act for the more effectual preventing the Abuses and Frauds of Persons employed in the working up the Woollen, Linen, Fustian, Cotton, and Iron Manufactures of this Kingdom;" (Note: Woollen Manufactures Act 1702 (1 Ann. St. 2. c. 22)) and for extending the said Act to the Manufactures of Leather. (Repealed by Master and Servant Act 1889 (52 & 53 Vict. c. 24))
Hockliffe and Stony Stratford Road Act 1739 (repealed)	13 Geo. 2. c. 9	19 March 1740
An Act for repairing the Road between Hockliffe, in the County of Bedford, and Stony Stratford, in the County of Buckingham. (Repealed by Hockliffe and Stony Stratford Road Act 1830 (11 Geo. 4 & 1 Will. 4 c. lxxxiii))
Mutiny Act 1739 (repealed)	13 Geo. 2. c. 10	19 March 1740
An Act for punishing Mutiny and Desertion, and for the better Payment of the Army and their Quarters. (Repealed by Statute Law Revision Act 1867 (30 & 31 Vict. c. 59))
River Dun Navigation Act 1739 (repealed)	13 Geo. 2. c. 11	19 March 1740
An Act for the more effectual improving the Navigation of the River Dun, from a Place called Wilsick House, in the Parish of Barmby Dun, in the County of York, to Fishlock Ferry, in the same County. (Repealed by Tinsley and Doncaster Turnpike Road Extension Act 1849 (12 & 13 Vict. c. lxiv))
Church in Sheffield Act 1739	13 Geo. 2. c. 12	19 March 1740
An Act for making a Chapel, lately built by Robert Downes Goldsmith, and others, in the Town of Sheffield, in the County of York, a perpetual Cure and Benefice; and for making a Provision for the Maintenance of the Curate or Minister of the said Chapel, pursuant to an Agreement for that Purpose.
Provision for the Princess Mary Act 1739 (repealed)	13 Geo. 2. c. 13	19 March 1740
An Act for providing a Marriage Portion for the Princess Mary. (Repealed by Statute Law Revision Act 1867 (30 & 31 Vict. c. 59))
Whitehaven Harbour Improvement Act 1739	13 Geo. 2. c. 14	29 April 1740
An Act for making more effectual Two Acts of Parliament, passed in the Seventh (Note: Whitehaven Harbour Act 1708 (7 Ann. c. 9)) and Tenth (Note: Whitehaven Harbour Act 1711 (10 Ann. c. 17)) Years of Her late Majesty Queen Anne, for preserving and enlarging the Harbour of Whitehaven, in the County of Cumberland; and for repairing and amending the High Roads leading to the said Harbour and Town of Whitehaven.
Oxfordshire Roads Act 1739 (repealed)	13 Geo. 2. c. 15	29 April 1740
An Act for continuing and making more effectual an Act passed in the Fifth Year of the Reign of His late Majesty King George the First, (Note: Stokenchurch and New Woodstock Road Act 1718 (5 Geo. 1. c. 1 Pr.)) for repairing the Roads from the Top of Stoken-Church-Hill (Note: Stokenchurch, Oxfordshire.) to Enslow Bridge, (Note: Enslow Bridge, where the A4095 road crosses the River Cherwell, west of Enslow, Oxfordshire. 51°51′45″N 1°18′28″W) and the Road from Wheatly Bridge, (Note: Wheatley Bridge, where the London Road (former A40) crosses the River Thame east of Wheatley, Oxfordshire. 51°44′32″N 1°06′54″W) through the City of Oxon, by Begbrook, to New Woodstock, in the County of Oxon (except the Mile-way on each Side of the said City); and for repairing the Road from the Crown Alehouse to the Turnpike on Stoken-Church-Hill aforesaid. (Repealed by Stokenchurch and New Woodstock Road Act 1778 (18 Geo. 3 c. 91))
Westminster Bridge Act 1739 (repealed)	13 Geo. 2. c. 16	29 April 1740
An Act to give further Powers to the Commissioners for building a Bridge cross the River Thames, from the City of Westminster to the opposite Shore in the County of Surrey; and to enable them to raise a further Sum of Money, towards finishing the said Bridge, and to perform the other Trusts reposed in them. (Repealed by Westminster Bridge Act 1853 (16 & 17 Vict. c. 46))
Exemption from Impressment Act 1739 (repealed)	13 Geo. 2. c. 17	29 April 1740
An Act for the Increase of Mariners and Seamen, to navigate Merchant Ships, and other Trading Ships or Vessels. (Repealed by Statute Law Revision Act 1948 (11 & 12 Geo. 6. c. 62))
Laws Continuance, etc. Act 1739 (repealed)	13 Geo. 2. c. 18	29 April 1740
An Act to continue several Laws therein mentioned, for punishing such Persons as shall wilfully and maliciously pull down or destroy Turnpikes for repairing Highways, or Locks or other Works erected by Authority of Parliament for making Rivers navigable; for preventing Exactions of the Occupiers of Locks and Wears upon the River of Thames Westward, and for ascertaining the Rates of Water-carriage upon the said River; for preventing frivolous and vexatious Arrests; and for better securing the lawful Trade of His Majesty's Subjects to and from The East Indies, and for the more effectual preventing all His Majesty's Subjects trading thither under Foreign Commissions; and for limiting the Time for suing forth Writs of Certiorari upon Proceedings before Justices of the Peace, and for regulating the Time and Manner of applying for the same; for the better and more speedy Execution of Process within particular Franchises or Liberties; and for extending the Powers and Authorities of Justices of the Peace of Counties, touching County Rates, to the Justices of the Peace of such Liberties and Franchises as have Commissions of the Peace within themselves. (Repealed by Statute Law Revision Act 1888 (51 & 52 Vict. c. 3))
Gaming Act 1739 (repealed)	13 Geo. 2. c. 19	29 April 1740
An Act to restrain and prevent the excessive Increase of Horse-races; and for amending an Act made in the last Session of Parliament, intituled, "An Act for the more effectual preventing of excessive and deceitful Gaming." (Note: Gaming Act 1738 (12 Geo. 2. c. 28)) (Repealed by for England and Wales and Scotland by Betting and Gaming Act 1960 (8 & 9 Eliz. 2. c. 60) and for Northern Ireland by Statute Law Revision (Northern Ireland) Act 1980 (c. 59))
Parliamentary Elections (Fraudulent Conveyances) Act 1739 (repealed)	13 Geo. 2. c. 20	29 April 1740
An Act for more effectually preventing fraudulent Qualifications of Persons to vote as Freeholders, in the Election of Members to serve in Parliament, for such Cities and Towns as are Counties of themselves, in that Part of Great Britain called England. (Repealed by Parliamentary Elections Act 1745 (19 Geo. 2. c. 28) and Representation of the People Act 1918 (7 & 8 Geo. 5. c. 64))
Destruction of Coal Works Act 1739 (repealed)	13 Geo. 2. c. 21	29 April 1740
An Act for further and more effectually preventing the wilful and malicious Destruction of Collieries and Coal-works. (Repealed for England and Wales by Criminal Statutes Repeal Act 1827 (7 & 8 Geo. 4. c. 27) and for India by Criminal Law (India) Act 1828 (9 Geo. 4. c. 74))
Warwick Roads Act 1739 (repealed)	13 Geo. 2. c. 22	29 April 1740
An Act for enlarging the Term and Powers granted and given by an Act passed in the Tenth Year of the Reign of His late Majesty King George the First, intituled, "An Act for repairing the Road leading from Dunchurch, in the County of Warwick, to the Bottom of Meriden Hill, in the same County;" (Note: Warwick Roads Act 1723 (10 Geo. 1. c. 15)) and for making the said Act more effectual. (Repealed by Farnworth and Ainsworth Turnpike Road Act 1824 (5 Geo. 4. c. xliii))
Supply, etc. Act 1739 (repealed)	13 Geo. 2. c. 23	29 April 1740
An Act for granting to His Majesty the Sum of One Million, out of the Sinking Fund, for the Service of the Year One Thousand Seven Hundred and Forty; and for enabling His Majesty to raise the further Sum of Two Hundred Thousand Pounds, out of the growing Produce of the said Fund; and for granting to His Majesty the Sum of Twenty-one Thousand Pounds, One Shilling, and Eight Pence Half-penny, remaining in the Receipt of His Majesty's Exchequer, arisen by Sale of Lands in the Island of St. Christophers; and for the further appropriating the Supplies granted in this Session of Parliament. (Repealed by Statute Law Revision Act 1867 (30 & 31 Vict. c. 59))
Vagrants Act 1739 (repealed)	13 Geo. 2. c. 24	29 April 1740
An Act for amending and enforcing the Laws relating to Rogues, Vagabonds, and other idle and disorderly Persons; and for reducing the same into One Act of Parliament; and also for amending the Laws for erecting, providing, and regulating, Houses of Correction. (Repealed by Justices Commitment Act 1743 (17 Geo. 2. c. 5))
Staines Bridge Act 1739 (repealed)	13 Geo. 2. c. 25	29 April 1740
An Act for the more effectual Maintenance and Well-keeping of Staines Bridge and Egham Causeway, being the Highway from London to the West Parts of England. (Repealed by Staines Bridge Act 1791 (31 Geo. 3. c. 84))
River Medway Navigation Act 1739 (repealed)	13 Geo. 2. c. 26	29 April 1740
An Act to revive, explain, and amend, an Act made in the Sixteenth and Seventeenth Years of the Reign of His late Majesty King Charles the Second, intituled, "An Act for making the River of Medway navigable, in the Counties of Kent and Sussex." (Note: River Medway (Kent and Sussex) Navigation Act 1664 (16 & 17 Cha. 2. c. 12 Pr.)) (Repealed by Upper Medway Navigation and Conservancy Act 1911 (1 & 2 Geo. 5. c. xxiii) and Southern Water Authority Act 1982 (c. xxii))
Commerce with Spain Act 1739 (repealed)	13 Geo. 2. c. 27	29 April 1740
An Act for prohibiting Commerce with Spain. (Repealed by Naval Prize Acts Repeal Act 1864 (27 & 28 Vict. c. 23))
Continuance of Laws, etc. Act 1739 (repealed)	13 Geo. 2. c. 28	29 April 1740
An Act for continuing the several Laws therein mentioned, relating to the Premiums upon the Importation of Masts, Yards, and Bowsprits, Tar, Pitch, and Turpentine; to British-made Sail Cloth, and the Duties payable on Foreign Sail Cloth; to the Greenland and to the Whale Fishery; for granting a further Bounty for all Ships employed in the Whale Fishery during the present War; for exempting Harponeers and others, employed in the Greenland Fishery Trade, from being impressed; and for giving further Time for the Payment of Duties omitted to be paid for the Indentures and Contracts of Clerks and Apprentices. (Repealed by Statute Law Revision Act 1867 (30 & 31 Vict. c. 59))
Foundling Hospital Act 1739 or the Foundling Hospital Act 1740	13 Geo. 2. c. 29	29 April 1740
An Act for confirming and enlarging the Powers granted by His Majesty to the Governors and Guardians of the Hospital for the Maintenance and Education of exposed and deserted young Children, by His most Gracious Charter, bearing Date the Seventeenth Day of October, in the Year of our Lord One Thousand Seven Hundred and Thirty-nine; and to enable them to execute the good Purposes of the said Charter.
River Colne, Essex, Navigation Act 1739 (repealed)	13 Geo. 2. c. 30	29 April 1740
An Act for further enlarging the Term granted by an Act of the Ninth and Tenth Years of the Reign of King William the Third, (Note: Navigation (Colchester to Wivenhoe) Act 1697 (9 Will. 3. c. 19)) for cleansing and making navigable the Channel, from The Hithe at Colchester, to Wivenhoe; and for making the said Act, and another Act of the Fifth Year of the Reign of His late Majesty King George the First, (Note: Colne River, Essex Navigation Act 1718 (5 Geo. 1. c. 31)) for enlarging the Term granted by the said Act of the Ninth and Tenth Years of the Reign of King William the Third, more effectual. (Repealed by Colchester and Wivenhoe Navigation and Colchester Improvement Act 1811 (51 Geo. 3 c. xliii))

=== Private acts ===
Short title	Citation	Royal assent
Long title
Naturalization of John-George Liebenrood, Bartholomew-Christopher Lutyens and Others Act 1739	13 Geo. 2. c. 1 Pr.	20 December 1739
An Act for naturalizing John Georg Liebenrood, Bartholomew Christopher Lutyens, and others.
Explaining and rendering more effectual powers in William Lord Craven's will for making jointures and leases.	13 Geo. 2. c. 2 Pr.	19 March 1740
An Act for explaining several Powers contained in the Will of William late Lord Craven, for making Jointures and Leases; and for rendering the same Powers more effectual for the Purposes thereby intended.
Great Bircham (Norfolk) Inclosure etc. Act 1739	13 Geo. 2. c. 3 Pr.	19 March 1740
An Act for confirming and establishing an Exchange agreed upon between the Lord of the Manor and the Rector of the Parish Church of Great Bircham, in the County of Norfolk; and for promoting and facilitating an Enclosure intended to be made of divers Commons, Common Pasture, and Waste Grounds, lying in the said Parish of Great Bircham.
Restitution of William Grierson Act 1739	13 Geo. 2. c. 4 Pr.	19 March 1740
An Act to enable William Grierson, the Eldest Son of Sir Robert Grierson of Lag Baronet, to sue, or maintain any Action or Suit, notwithstanding his Attainder; and to remove any Disability in him, by reason of his said Attainder, to take or inherit any Real or Personal Estate that may have descended or otherwise come to him since His late Majesty's most Gracious Pardon, dated the Twenty-ninth Day of June in the Eleventh Year of His Reign, or that shall hereafter descend or otherwise come to him.
Thomas Bettesworth: enabling him and his heirs male to take the surname Bilson, pursuant to the will of Leonard Bilson.	13 Geo. 2. c. 5 Pr.	19 March 1740
An Act to enable Thomas Bettesworth Esquire and his Heirs Male to take and use the Surname of Bilson, pursuant to the Will of Leonard Bilson Esquire, deceased.
Naturalization of Amalie Sophie de Wallmoden Act 1739	13 Geo. 2. c. 6 Pr.	19 March 1740
An Act for naturalizing Amalie Sophie de Wallmoden.
Naturalization of Anthony Vazeille, Stephen St. Andre and Others Act 1739	13 Geo. 2. c. 7 Pr.	19 March 1740
An Act for naturalizing Anthony Vazeille, Stephen Saint André and others.
Naturalization of Isaac Olier, Christian Schutte, John-Daniel Cotton and Henry Lyell Act 1739	13 Geo. 2. c. 8 Pr.	19 March 1740
An Act for naturalizing Isaac Olier, Christian Schutte, John Daniel Cottin, and Henry Lyell.
Explaining and enlarging powers for appointing portions and settling jointures which are contained in letters patent dated 22 October 1674 whereby yearly pensions, issuing out of the hereditary revenue of excise, stand limited to William Duke of Cleveland and Charles Duke of Grafton and their male heirs.	13 Geo. 2. c. 9 Pr.	29 April 1740
An Act to explain and enlarge the several Powers for appointing Portions, and settling Jointures, which are contained in certain Letters Patent, bearing Date the Twenty-second Day of October, in the Twenty-sixth Year of the Reign of King Charles the Second, whereby certain Yearly Pensions, issuing out of the Hereditary Revenue of Excise, do now stand limited to William Duke of Cleveland and Charles Duke of Grafton, and the Heirs Male of their Bodies respectively.
George Earl of Halifax's Estate Act 1739	13 Geo. 2. c. 10 Pr.	29 April 1740
An Act for vesting the Inheritance of Part of the Estate of George late Earl of Halifax, deceased, in Trustees, for Payment of his Debts, Daughters Portions, and Legacies.
Rusthall Manor Act 1739	13 Geo. 2. c. 11 Pr.	29 April 1740
An Act for confirming and establishing certain Articles of Agreement, made between Maurice Conyers Esquire, Lord of the Manor of Rusthall, in the County of Kent, and the Right Honourable William Lord Abergavenny and other Freehold Tenants of the said Manor, relating to certain Buildings and Enclosures made and erected in and upon Part of the Wastes of the said Manor; and for making the said Agreement more effectual for the Purposes thereby intended.
Sir William Morice's Estate Act 1739	13 Geo. 2. c. 12 Pr.	29 April 1740
An Act to enable Sir William Morice Baronet to grant to the Incumbent of the Parish Church of Werington, in the County of Devon, and his Successors, and the Parishioners of the said Parish, a Piece of Ground belonging to the Capital Messuage of Werington, in the said County.
Confirming and establishing an agreement between William Gore, executor for Edward Gore, and Mary Gore, for herself and on behalf of Charles Gore an infant, concerning £3,000 paid by Francis Freeman to Edward Gore.	13 Geo. 2. c. 13 Pr.	29 April 1740
An Act for establishing and confirming an Agreement between William Gore Esquire, Executor of Edward Gore Esquire, deceased, and Mary Gore, Widow of Thomas Gore Esquire, deceased, for herself and on the Behalf of Charles Gore an Infant, relating to the Sum of Three Thousand Pounds paid by Francis Freeman Gentleman to the said Edward Gore.
Exchange of Thomas Inwen's lands in Wootton (Bedfordshire) for lands also in Wootton belonging to Sidney Sussex College, Cambridge.	13 Geo. 2. c. 14 Pr.	29 April 1740
An Act for exchanging several Lands and Grounds, belonging to Thomas Inwen Esquire, in the Parish of Wootton, in the County of Bedford, for other Lands, of equal Value, in the same Parish, belonging to the Master, Fellows, and Scholars, of Sidney Sussex College in Cambridge.
Henry Talbot's Estate Act 1739	13 Geo. 2. c. 15 Pr.	29 April 1740
An Act for selling Part of the settled Estate of Henry Talbot Esquire, in the Counties of Warwick and Derby; and for settling another Estate, in the County of Rutland, of greater Value, to the same Uses.
Bewholme (parish of Nunkeeling) (Yorkshire) inclosure and establishment of a yearly sum to the impropriators of Nunkeeling rectory in lieu of tithes.	13 Geo. 2. c. 16 Pr.	29 April 1740
An Act for making Divisions, Enclosures, and Allotments, of the Open Corn Fields and Common Pasture, in the Lordship of Bewholm, otherwise Bewham, in the Parish of Nunkeeling, in the County of York; and for settling and establishing the Payment of a Yearly Sum to the Impropriators of the Rectory of Nunkeeling aforesaid, and their Heirs, in Lieu of Tithes arising within the said Lordship, pursuant to an Agreement between the said Impropriators and the Proprietors of the said Lands.
Charlton (Parish of Andover) (Hampshire) Inclosure Act 1739	13 Geo. 2. c. 17 Pr.	29 April 1740
An Act for confirming and establishing Articles of Agreement, and an Award, for dividing and enclosing of a Common Down; and for dividing, enclosing, and exchanging, of Lands lying in the Tithing of Charlton, in the Parish of Andover, in the County of Southampton.
Stivichall (Warwickshire) Inclosure Act 1739	13 Geo. 2. c. 18 Pr.	29 April 1740
An Act for dividing and enclosing the Common Fields, in the Parish of Stivichall, alias Stichall, in the County of the City of Coventry.
Gunnerton (Northumberland) Inclosure Act 1739	13 Geo. 2. c. 19 Pr.	29 April 1740
An Act for enclosing and dividing the Common Fields, Common Pastures, and Waste Grounds, lying within the Manor and Township of Gunnerton, in the County of Northumberland.

=== Sources ===
- Pickering, Danby, ed. (1765). "Anno decimo tertio Georgii II". The Statutes at Large. Vol. 17: From the Ninth to the 15th Year of King George II. pp. 358–418 – via Internet Archive.
- Pickering, Danby, ed. (1765). "Anno decimo tertio Georgii II". The Statutes at Large. Vol. 17: From the Ninth to the 15th Year of King George II. pp. 358–418 – via Google Books.
- Journals of the House of Commons. Vol. 23. London: His Majesty's Stationery Office. 1803. pp. 382–530 – via Google Books.
- Chronological Table of and Index to the Statutes. Vol. 1: To the End of the Session 59 Vict. Sess. 2 (1895) (13th ed.). London: Her Majesty's Stationery Office. 1896. p. 106 – via Google Books.

== See also ==
- List of acts of the Parliament of Great Britain
