= Naval Prize Acts Repeal Act 1864 =

Act of the Parliament of the United Kingdom

Naval Prize Acts Repeal Act 1864 (Note: Section 3.)
- Act of Parliament
- Parliament of the United Kingdom
- Long title: An Act to repeal Enactments relating to Naval Prize of War and Matters connected therewith or with the Discipline or Management of the Navy.
- Citation: 27 & 28 Vict. c. 23
- Introduced by: Henry Brand (Commons)
- Territorial extent: United Kingdom

Dates
- Royal assent: 23 June 1864
- Commencement: 1 January 1865 (Note: See § Short title, commencement and extent)
- Repealed: 23 May 1950
Other legislation
Amends	See § Repealed enactments
Repeals/revokes	See § Repealed enactments
Repealed by	Statute Law Revision Act 1950
Relates to	Naval Agency and Distribution Act 1864; Naval Prize Act 1864

Status: Repealed

Text of statute as originally enacted

The Naval Prize Acts Repeal Act 1864 (27 & 28 Vict. c. 23) was an act of the Parliament of the United Kingdom that repealed various enactments relating to naval prize of war and the management of the Royal Navy.

== Passage ==
Leave to bring in the Naval Prize Acts Repeal Bill was granted to the Secretary to the Admiralty, Lord Clarence Paget and the Civil Lord of the Admiralty, James Stansfeld on 1 March 1864. The bill had its first reading in the House of Commons on 2 March 1864, presented by Henry Brand. The bill had its second reading in the House of Commons on 7 April 1864 and was committed to a committee of the whole house, which met and reported on 14 April 1864 with amendments. The amended bill was re-committed to a committee of the whole house, which met and reported on 5 May 1864, without amendments. The amended bill had its third reading in the House of Commons on 9 May 1864 and passed, without amendments.

The amended Bill had its first reading in the House of Lords on 10 May 1864. The bill had its second reading in the House of Lords on 27 May 1864 and was committed to a committee of the whole house, which met and reported on 3 June 1864, without amendments. The bill had its third reading in the House of Lords on 21 June 1864 and passed, without amendments.

The bill was granted royal assent on 23 June 1864.

== Provisions ==
=== Repealed enactments ===
Section 1 of the act repealed 56 enactments, listed in the schedule to the act.

Citation	Short title	Title	Extent of repeal
6 Ann. c. 65 (Note: This is the chapter in The Statutes of the Realm.) 6 Ann. c. 13 (Note: This is the chapter in The Statutes at Large.)	Security to Merchant Ships Act 1707	An Act for the better securing the Trade of this Kingdom by Cruisers and Convoys.	The whole act.
6 Ann. c. 64 6 Ann. c. 37	Trade to America Act 1707	An Act for the Encouragement of the Trade to America.	The whole act.
9 Ann. c. 29 9 Ann. c. 27	Trade to America Act 1710	An Act for the Encouragement of the Trade to America.	The whole act.
10 Ann. c. 30 10 Ann. c. 22	Importation of Prize Goods Act 1711	An Act for Relief of Merchants importing Prize Goods from America.	The whole act.
13 Geo. 2. c. 4	Naval Prize Act 1739	An Act for the more effectual securing and encouraging the Trade of His Majesty's British Subjects to America, and for the Encouragement of Seamen to enter into His Majesty's Service.	The whole act.
13 Geo. 2. c. 27	Commerce with Spain Act 1739	An Act for prohibiting Commerce with Spain	The whole act.
17 Geo. 2. c. 34	Naval Prize Act 1743	An Act for the better Encouragement of Seamen in His Majesty's Service, and Privateers, to annoy the Enemy.	The whole act.
19 Geo. 2. c. 30	Sugar Trade Act 1745	An Act for the better Encouragement of the Trade of His Majesty's Sugar Colonies in America.	The whole act.
20 Geo. 2. c. 24	Naval Prize Act 1746	An .Act for the better securing the Payment of Shares of Prizes taken from the Enemy to the Royal Hospital at Greenwich; and for preventing the Embezzlement of Goods and Stores belonging to the said Hospital.	The whole act.
20 Geo. 2. c. 35	Prize Act 1746	An Act to indemnify Persons who have omitted to register their Letters of Attorney, appointing them .Agents for Prizes within the Time limited by Law; and for allowing further Time for that Purpose.	The whole act.
22 Geo. 2. c. 3	Prize Causes Act 1748	An Act declaring the Authority of the Commissioners appointed by His Majesty under the Great Seal of Great Britain, for receiving, hearing, and determining Appeals in Causes of Prizes.	The whole act.
29 Geo. 2. c. 34	Naval Prize, etc. Act 1756	An Act for the Encouragement of Seamen, and the more speedy and effectual manning His Majesty's Navy.	The whole act.
30 Geo. 2. c. 18	Prize Goods Act 1757	An Act for the Relief and Encouragement of the Captors of Prizes, with respect to the bringing and landing Prize Goods in this Kingdom.	The whole act.
32 Geo. 2. c. 25	Naval Prize Act 1758	An Act to explain and amend an Act made in the Twenty-ninth Year of His present Majesty's Reign, intituled "An Act for the Encouragement of Seamen," and the more speedy and effectual manning His Majesty's Navy; and for the better Prevention of Piracies and Robberies by Crews of private Ships of War.	The whole act.
33 Geo. 2. c. 19	Prize, Greenwich Hospital etc. Act 1759	An Act for the more effectual securing the Payment of such Prize and Bounty Monies as were appropriated to the Use of Greenwich Hospital, by an Act made in the Twenty-ninth Year of the Reign of His present Majesty, intituled "An Act for the Encouragement of Seamen, and the more speedy and effectual manning His Majesty's Navy."	The whole act.
2 Geo. 3. c. 16	Navy Act 1762	An Act for the Encouragement of Seamen, and the more speedy and effectual manning His Majesty's Navy.	The whole act.
12 Geo. 3. c. 25	Naval Prize Act 1772	An Act for the more effectual vesting in the Royal Hospital at Greenwich the forfeited and unclaimed Shares of Naval Officers, Seamen, and Marines, in Prizes taken from the Enemy; and for other Purposes therein mentioned.	The whole act.
18 Geo. 3. c. 15	Prize Act 1778	An Act for the Relief of the Captors of Prizes, with respect to the bringing and landing certain Prize Goods in this Kingdom.	The whole act.
19 Geo. 3. c. 5	Prize Act 1779	An Act for granting Relief to the Captors of Prizes, with respect to bringing and landing certain French Prizes in this Kingdom.	The whole act.
19 Geo. 3. c. 67	Navy Act 1779	An Act for the Encouragement of Seamen, and the more speedy and effectual manning His Majesty's Navy.	The whole act.
20 Geo. 3. c. 9	Prize Act 1780	An Act for extending the Provisions of Two Acts made in the Eighteenth Year of His present Majesty's Reign, and in the last Session of Parliament, with respect to bringing Prize Goods into this Kingdom, to Spanish Prize Goods; and for repealing so much of the said last-mentioned Act as relates to the Certificate for Prize Tea and East India Goods exported from this Kingdom to Ireland; for the Removal of East India Goods condemned as Prize at any Out-Port to London for Sale, and of Prize Goods for Exportation; and for reducing the Duty on Foreign Prize Tobacco.	The whole act.
20 Geo. 3. c. 23	Navy Act 1780	An Act to amend an Act made in the last Session of Parliament, intituled "An Act for the Encouragement of Seamen, and the more speedy and effectual manning His Majesty's Navy;" and for making further Provision for those Purposes.	The whole act.
21 Geo. 3. c. 5	Prize Act 1781	An Act for extending the Provisions of Three Acts, made in the Eighteenth, Nineteenth, and Twentieth Years of His present Majesty's Reign, with respect to bringing Prize Goods into this Kingdom, to Prizes taken from the States General of the United Provinces; for declaring what Goods shall be deemed Military or Ship Stores; for regulating the Sale of and ascertaining the Duties upon East India Goods condemned as Prize in the Port of London; for permitting the Purchasers of Prize Goods condemned abroad to import such Goods into this Kingdom, under the like Regulations and Advantages as are granted by Law to Captors themselves; and for reducing the Duties on Foreign Prize Tobacco.	The whole act.
21 Geo. 3. c. 15	Navy Act 1781	An Act for the Encouragement of Seamen, and for the more speedy and effectual manning His Majesty's Navy.	The whole act.
21 Geo. 3. c. 44	Prize (No. 2) Act 1781	An Act for the more effectually securing to the Royal Hospital for Seamen at Greenwich, all such forfeited and unclaimed Shares of Prize and Bounty Money as shall arise from or in respect of any Prizes to be condemned and sold in His Majesty's Dominions beyond the Sea; and to compel the more speedy Payment thereof.	The whole act.
22 Geo. 3. c. 15	Prize Act 1782	An Act for the Relief of Naval Officers, Seamen, Marines, and Soldiers with respect to Prize and Bounty Money not claimed in due Time.	The whole act.
22 Geo. 3. c. 25	Prize (No. 2) Act 1782	An Act to prohibit the Ransoming of Ships or Vessels captured from His Majesty's Subjects, and of the Merchandize or Goods on board such Ships or Vessels.	The whole act.
23 Geo. 3. c. 57	Prize Act 1783	An Act for the Sale of Prize Goods secured in Warehouses in this Kingdom for which the Duties are not paid or the Goods exported within a limited Time.	The whole act.
33 Geo. 3. c. 66	Manning of the Navy, etc. Act 1793	An Act for the Encouragement of Seamen, and for the better and more effectually manning His Majesty's Navy.	The whole act.
35 Geo. 3. c. 121	Manning of the Navy (No. 6) Act 1795	An Act to explain and amend an Act made in the Twentieth Year of the Reign of His present Majesty, intituled "An Act to amend an Act made in the last Session of Parliament, intituled 'An Act for the Encouragement of Seamen, and for the better and more effectual manning His Majesty's Navy; and for making further Provisions for those Purposes;'" and also an Act made in the Twenty-first Year of the Reign of His present Majesty, intituled "An Act for the Encouragement of Seamen, and the more speedy and effectual manning His Majesty's Navy;" and for the better Encouragement of Seamen for His Majesty's Navy.	The whole act.
37 Geo. 3. c. 109	Manning of the Navy, etc. Act 1797	An Act to amend an Act made in the Thirty-third Year of the Reign of His present Majesty, intituled "An Act for the Encouragement of Seamen, and for the better and more effectually manning His Majesty's Navy;" and for making further Provision for those Purposes.	The whole act.
38 Geo. 3. c. 38	Prize Causes Act 1798	An Act for declaring the Validity of Two Orders in Council, dated the Sixth Day of August One thousand seven hundred and ninety-four and the Thirtieth Day of March One thousand seven hundred and ninety-eight; and for enlarging the Time of appealing in Prize Causes; and for permitting Appeals to be prosecuted after such Time shall have elapsed in such special Causes as His Majesty by any Order in Council shall authorize.	The whole act.
41 Geo. 3. (U.K.) c. 76	Letters of Marque Act 1801	An Act to authorize the issuing of Commissions and Letters of Marque and Reprisal against His Majesty's Enemies, to such Ships and Vessels belonging to His Majesty or are or may be employed in the Service of the Boards of Customs and Excise, and other Public Boards in this Kingdom.	The whole act.
41 Geo. 3. (U.K.) c. 96	Prize Act 1801	An Act for the better Regulation of His Majesty's Prize Courts in the West Indies and America, and for giving a more speedy and effectual Execution of the Decrees of the Lords Commissioners of Appeals.	The whole act.
43 Geo. 3. c. 134	Prize Goods Act 1803	An Act for the Relief of the Captors of Prizes, with respect to the bringing and landing certain Prize Goods in Great Britain, during Hostilities.	The whole act.
43 Geo. 3. c. 160	Encouragement of Seamen, etc. Act 1803	An Act for the Encouragement of Seamen, and for the better and more effectually manning His Majesty's Navy; for regulating the Payment of Prize Money; and for making Provision for the Salaries of the Judges of the Vice-Admiralty Courts in the Island of Malta, and in the Bermuda and Bahama Islands.	The whole act.
45 Geo. 3. c. 72	Manning of the Navy Act 1805	An Act for the Encouragement of Seamen, and for the better and more effectually manning His Majesty's Navy during the present War.	The whole act.
48 Geo. 3. c. 100	Prize Act 1808	An Act for extending the Provisions of an Act made in the Forty-seventh Year of His present Majesty, so far as respects the Payment of Prize Money arising from Captures made by Foreign States in conjunction with British Ships, to Captures made by the Land Forces of Foreign States in conjunction with the British.	The whole act.
48 Geo. 3. c. 132	Reprisals Against Foreign Ships, etc. Act 1808	An Act to extend the Provisions of an Act passed in the Forty-fifth Year of His present Majesty, for the Encouragement of Seamen and better manning His Majesty's Navy, to Cases arising in consequence of Hostilities commenced since the passing of the said Act.	The whole act.
49 Geo. 3. c. 123	Prize Money Act 1809	An Act to explain and amend an Act made in the Forty-fifth Year of His present Majesty, for the Encouragement of Seamen and for the better and more effectually manning His Majesty's Navy during the present War; and for the further Encouragement of Seamen; and for the better and more effectually providing for the Interest of the Royal Hospital for Seamen at Greenwich, and the Royal Hospital for Soldiers at Chelsea; and to extend the Provisions of the said Act to Cases arising in consequence of Hostilities commenced since the passing of the said Act.	The whole act.
53 Geo. 3. c. 63	American Prizes Act 1813	An Act to extend Two Acts of the Forty-fifth and Forty-ninth Years of His present Majesty to America and Prize.	The whole act.
54 Geo. 3. c. 93	Navy Prize Money Act 1814	An Act for regulating the Payment of Navy Prize Money, and the Transmission of Accounts and Payment of Balances to Greenwich Hospital.	The whole act.
55 Geo. 3. c. 160	Prize, etc. Act 1815	An Act for the Encouragement of Seamen, and the more effectual manning of His Majesty's Navy during the present War.	The whole act.
57 Geo. 3. c. 118	Navy Prize Money, etc. Act 1817	An Act for authorizing the Executors or Administrators of deceased licensed Navy Agents to receive Prize Money, Bounty Money, and other Allowances of Money upon Orders given to such deceased Agents	So far as the same relates to Licences for Receipt of Shares of any Money distributable among the Officers and Crew of any of Her Majesty's Ships of War within the Meaning of The Naval Agency and Distribution Act, 1864.
57 Geo. 3. c. 127	Prize Money, etc. Act 1817	An Act to settle the Share of Prize Money, Droits of Admiralty, and Bounty Money payable to Greenwich Hospital, and for securing to the said Hospital all unclaimed Shares of Vessels found derelict, and of Seizures for Breach of Revenue, Colonial, Navigation, and Share Abolition Laws.	The whole act.
58 Geo. 3. c. 64	Naval Prize Money, etc. Act 1818	An Act to make further Regulations respecting the Payment of Navy Prize Money, and to authorize the Governors of Greenwich Hospital to pay over certain Shares of Prize Money due to Russian Seamen to his Excellency the Russian Ambassador.	The whole act.
59 Geo. 3. c. 56	Navy Prize Orders Act 1819	An Act to make further Regulations as to the Payment of Navy Prize Orders	So far as the same relates to any Money distributable among the Officers and Crew of any of Her Majesty's Ships of War within the Meaning of The Naval Agency and Distribution Act, 1864.
1 Geo. 4. c. 85	Naval Prize Money Act 1820	An Act to make further Provisions respecting Naval Prize Money	So far as the same relates to any Money distributable among the Officers and Crew of any of Her Majesty's Ships of War within the Meaning of The Naval Agency and Distribution Act, 1864.
10 Geo. 4. c. 25	Greenwich Hospital Act 1829	An Act to provide for the better Management of the Affairs of Greenwich Hospital	Section Eight, so far as the same relates to Naval Prize Money, or to any Per-centage, Deduction, or Payment out of any Money distributable among the Officers and Crew of any of Her Majesty's Ships of War within the Meaning of The Naval Agency and Distribution Act, 1864, or to forfeited or unclaimed Shares or Balances of Prize Money, or to any Power, Authority, Right, or Duty relating to Naval Prize, or to any Account or Pains or Penalties in any Manner connected therewith.
10 Geo. 4. c. 26	Greenwich Hospital Outpensions, etc. Act 1829	An Act for transferring the Management of Greenwich Out-Pensioners and certain Duties in Matters of Prize to the Treasurer of the Navy	Section Seventeen and subsequent Sections to the End of the Act, so far as the same respectively relate to forfeited or unclaimed Shares or Balances of Prize Money, or to any Per-centage, Deduction, or Payment out of Proceeds of Prizes, or out of Grants to the Royal Navy or Marines, or out of any other Money distributable among the Officers and Crew of any of Her Majesty's Ships of War, within the Meaning of The Naval Agency and Distribution Act, 1864, or to any Power, Authority, Duty, Account, Matter, or Thing concerning Naval Prize Money, or concerning any Grant or other Money distributable as aforesaid, or concerning the Payment, Receipt, or Distribution of or the accounting for the same or any Part thereof, or otherwise in any Manner concerning Naval Prize or Capture.
11 Geo. 4 & 1 Will. 4. c. 20	Pay of the Navy Act 1830	An Act to amend and consolidate the Laws relating to the Pay of the Royal Navy	Section Sixty-six wholly, and the following Sections respectively so far as they relate to any Money distributable among the Officers and Crew of any of Her Majesty's Ships of War within the Meaning of The Naval Agency and Distribution Act, 1864; namely, Sections Twenty-two and Forty-seven, Sections Forty-eight to Fifty-two, both inclusive (except so far as the Five Sections last mentioned respectively relate to Wills or Administrations, or to deceased Officers, Seamen, or Marines), Sections Sixty, Sixty-seven, Seventy, Seventy-two, Seventy-eight, and Seventy-nine, and Sections Eighty-three and Eighty-four (except so far as the Two Sections last-mentioned respectively relate to deceased Officers, Seamen, or Marines).
2 & 3 Will. 4. c. 40	Admiralty Act 1832	An Act to amend the Laws relating to the Business of the Civil Departments of the Navy, and to make other Regulations for more effectually carrying on the Duties of the said Departments	Sections Twenty and Twenty-two wholly, and the following Sections respectively so far as they relate to any Money distributable among the Officers and Crew of any of Her Majesty's Ships of War within the Meaning of The Naval Agency and Distribution Act, 1864; namely, Sections Four, Eight, Nine, Nineteen, Twenty-one, and Twenty-nine.
13 & 14 Vict. c. 40	Naval Prize Act 1850	An Act to regulate the Disposition of the Naval Prize Balance.	The whole act.
17 & 18 Vict. c. 18	Prize Act, Russia, 1854	An Act for the Encouragement of Seamen, and the more effectual manning of Her Majesty's Navy during the present War.	The whole act.
17 & 18 Vict. c. 19	Naval Pay and Prize Act 1854	An Act for facilitating the Payment of Her Majesty's Navy, and the Payment and Distribution of Prize, Bounty, Salvage, and other Monies to and amongst the Officers and Crews of Her Majesty's Ships and Vessels of War; and for the better Regulation of the Accounts relating thereto	Except Sections Ten, Eleven, and Twelve, and except Section Thirteen so far as it relates to the paying of the Navy and the keeping of Accounts and Expenses in relation thereto.
26 & 27 Vict. c. 116	Navy Prize Agents Act 1863	An Act to provide for the Appointment of Navy Prize Agents, and respecting their Duties and Remuneration.	The whole act.

=== Short title, commencement and extent ===
Section 2 of the act provided that the act would come into force on the same day as the Naval Agency and Distribution Act 1864 (27 & 28 Vict. c. 24) and the Naval Prize Act 1864 (c. 25). Section 56 of the Naval Prize Act 1864 (c. 25) provided that that act would come into force on the same day as the Naval Agency and Distribution Act 1864 (c. 24). Section 57 of the Naval Agency and Distribution Act 1864 (c. 24) provided that that act would come into force no later than 1 January 1865, on a day appointed by an order in council. This was declared to be 1 January 1865 by section 1 of an order in council dated 1 November 1864.

Section 3 of the act provided that the act may be cited as "The Naval Prize Acts Repeal Act, 1864".

== Subsequent developments ==
The whole act was repealed by section 1(1) of, and the first schedule to, the Statute Law Revision Act 1950 (14 Geo. 6. c. 6), which came into force on 23 May 1950.
