= Maxey =

Maxey may refer to:

== Places ==
- Maxey, Cambridgeshire, village in the City of Peterborough in England
  - Maxey Castle, a medieval fortified manor house castle
- Maxey-sur-Meuse, commune in the Vosges department in Lorraine in France
- Maxey-sur-Vaise, commune in the Meuse department in Lorraine in France

== People ==
- Anthony Maxey (died 1618), Dean of Windsor and registrar of the Order of the Garter
- Glen Maxey (born 1952), American politician from Texas; state legislator
- JoAnn Maxey (1938–1992), American politician from Nebraska
- Johnny Maxey (born 1993), American football player
- Lawrence Maxey (contemporary), American musician and professor of music
- Linda Maxey (contemporary), American concert marimbist
- Marcus Maxey (born 1983), American professional football player
- Marlon Maxey (born 1969), American professional basketball player
- Maxey Dell Moody (1883-1949), American businessman
- Morris Maxey Titterington (1891–1928), American engineer and aviator
- Samuel B. Maxey (1825–1895), American soldier, lawyer, and politician from Texas; major general for the Confederacy during the American Civil War
- Thomas Sheldon Maxey (1846–1921), United States federal judge
- Tyrese Maxey (born 2000), American basketball player

== Other ==
- Camp Maxey, U.S. Army National Guard training base near Paris, Texas, USA; infantry training camp during World War II
- Maxey Flat, low-level radioactive waste facility Superfund site in Kentucky, U.S.
- Sam Bell Maxey House, Texas state historic site in Paris, Texas, U.S.
- W.J. Maxey Boys Training School, a former juvenile detention center in Whitmore Lake, Michigan, U.S.

== See also ==
- Maxie (disambiguation)
