= List of acts of the Parliament of Great Britain from 1757 =

This is a complete list of acts of the Parliament of Great Britain for the year 1757.

For acts passed until 1707, see the list of acts of the Parliament of England and the list of acts of the Parliament of Scotland. See also the list of acts of the Parliament of Ireland.

For acts passed from 1801 onwards, see the list of acts of the Parliament of the United Kingdom. For acts of the devolved parliaments and assemblies in the United Kingdom, see the list of acts of the Scottish Parliament, the list of acts of the Northern Ireland Assembly, and the list of acts and measures of Senedd Cymru; see also the list of acts of the Parliament of Northern Ireland.

The number shown after each act's title is its chapter number. Acts are cited using this number, preceded by the year(s) of the reign during which the relevant parliamentary session was held; thus the Union with Ireland Act 1800 is cited as "39 & 40 Geo. 3. c. 67", meaning the 67th act passed during the session that started in the 39th year of the reign of George III and which finished in the 40th year of that reign. Note that the modern convention is to use Arabic numerals in citations (thus "41 Geo. 3" rather than "41 Geo. III"). Acts of the last session of the Parliament of Great Britain and the first session of the Parliament of the United Kingdom are both cited as "41 Geo. 3".

Acts passed by the Parliament of Great Britain did not have a short title; however, some of these acts have subsequently been given a short title by acts of the Parliament of the United Kingdom (such as the Short Titles Act 1896).

Before the Acts of Parliament (Commencement) Act 1793 came into force on 8 April 1793, acts passed by the Parliament of Great Britain were deemed to have come into effect on the first day of the session in which they were passed. Because of this, the years given in the list below may in fact be the year before a particular act was passed.

== 30 Geo. 2 ==
The fourth session of the 11th Parliament of Great Britain, which met from 2 December 1756 until 4 July 1757.

This session was also traditionally cited as 30 G. 2.

=== Public acts ===
Short title	Citation	Royal assent
Long title
Exportation Act 1757 (repealed)	30 Geo. 2. c. 1	18 December 1756
An Act to prohibit, for a Time to be limited, the Exportation of Corn, Malt, Meal, Flour, Bread, Biscuit, and Starch. (Repealed by Exportation Act 1758 (32 Geo. 2. c. 8))
Quartering of Foreign Troops Act 1757 (repealed)	30 Geo. 2. c. 2	18 December 1756
An Act to make Provision for the quartering of the Foreign Troops, in His Majesty's Service, now in this Kingdom. (Repealed by Statute Law Revision Act 1867 (30 & 31 Vict. c. 59))
Land Tax Act 1757 (repealed)	30 Geo. 2. c. 3	19 January 1757
An Act for granting an Aid to His Majesty, by a Land Tax, to be raised in Great Britain, for the Service of the Year One Thousand Seven Hundred and Fifty-seven; and for discharging certain Arrears of Land Taxes incurred before the Time therein mentioned; and for the more effectual collecting of Arrears for the future. (Repealed by Statute Law Revision Act 1867 (30 & 31 Vict. c. 59))
Taxation Act 1757 (repealed)	30 Geo. 2. c. 4	19 January 1757
An Act for continuing and granting to His Majesty certain Duties upon Malt, Mum, Cyder, and Perry, for the Service of the Year One Thousand Seven Hundred and Fifty-seven; and concerning the Interest to be paid for Monies to be borrowed, as well on the Credit of this Act, as on the Credit of an Act of this Session of Parliament, (Note: Land Tax Act 1757 (30 Geo. 2. c. 3)) for granting an Aid to His Majesty by a Land Tax. (Repealed by Statute Law Revision Act 1867 (30 & 31 Vict. c. 59))
Public Lottery Act 1757 (repealed)	30 Geo. 2. c. 5	15 February 1757
An Act for granting to His Majesty a Sum, not exceeding One Million Fifty Thousand and Five Pounds and Five Shillings, to be raised by Way of Lottery. (Repealed by Statute Law Revision Act 1867 (30 & 31 Vict. c. 59))
Mutiny Act 1757 (repealed)	30 Geo. 2. c. 6	15 February 1757
An Act for punishing Mutiny and Desertion; and for the better Payment of the Army and their Quarters. (Repealed by Statute Law Revision Act 1867 (30 & 31 Vict. c. 59))
Discontinuance of Duties Act 1757 (repealed)	30 Geo. 2. c. 7	15 February 1757
An Act to discontinue, for a limited Time, the Duties upon Corn and Flour imported, and also upon such Corn, Grain, Meal, Bread, Biscuit, and Flour, as have been, or shall be, taken from the Enemy, and brought into this Kingdom. (Repealed by Statute Law Revision Act 1867 (30 & 31 Vict. c. 59))
Recruiting Act 1757 (repealed)	30 Geo. 2. c. 8	15 February 1757
An Act for the speedy and effectual Recruiting His Majesty's Land Forces and Marines. (Repealed by Statute Law Revision Act 1867 (30 & 31 Vict. c. 59))
Exportation (No. 2) Act 1757 (repealed)	30 Geo. 2. c. 9	15 February 1757
An Act to prohibit, for a limited Time, the Exportation of Corn, Grain, Meal, Malt, Flour, Bread, Biscuit, Starch, Beef, Pork, Bacon, and other Victual (except Fish and Roots, and Rice, to be exported to any Part of Europe Southward of Cape Finisterre) from His Majesty's Colonies and Plantations in America, unless to Great Britain or Ireland, or to some of the said Colonies and Plantations; and to permit the Importation of Corn and Flour into Great Britain and Ireland, in Neutral Ships; and to allow the Exportation of Wheat, Barley, Oats, Meal, and Flour, from Great Britain to the Isle of Man, for the Use of the Inhabitants there. (Repealed by Statute Law Revision Act 1867 (30 & 31 Vict. c. 59))
Distillation Act 1757 (repealed)	30 Geo. 2. c. 10	11 March 1757
An Act to prohibit, for a limited Time, the making of Low Wines, and Spirits from Wheat, Barley, Malt, or any other Sort of Grain, or from any Meal or Flour. (Repealed by Distillation Act 1759 (33 Geo. 2. c. 9))
Marine Mutiny Act 1757 (repealed)	30 Geo. 2. c. 11	11 March 1757
An Act for the Regulation of His Majesty's Marine Forces while on Shore. (Repealed by Statute Law Revision Act 1867 (30 & 31 Vict. c. 59))
Woollen Manufactures Act 1757 (repealed)	30 Geo. 2. c. 12	1 April 1757
An Act to amend an Act made in the Twenty-ninth Year of the Reign of His present Majesty, (Note: Woollen Manufacture Act 1756 (29 Geo. 2. c. 33)) intituled, "An Act to render more effectual an Act passed in the Twelfth Year of the Reign of His late Majesty King George, (Note: Woollen Manufactures Act 1725 (12 Geo. 1. c. 34)) to prevent unlawful Combinations of Workmen employed in the Woollen Manufactures, and for better Payment of their Wages; and also an Act passed in the Thirteenth Year of the Reign of His said late Majesty, (Note: Frauds of Workmen Act 1739 (13 Geo. 2. c. 8)) for the better Regulation of the Woollen Manufacture; and for preventing Disputes among the Persons concerned therein; and for limiting a Time for prosecuting for the Forfeiture appointed by the aforesaid Act, in case of Payment of the Workmen's Wages in any other Manner than in Money." (Repealed by Master and Servant Act 1889 (52 & 53 Vict. c. 24))
Recruiting (No. 2) Act 1757 (repealed)	30 Geo. 2. c. 13	6 May 1757
An Act to rectify a Mistake in an Act passed this Session of Parliament, intituled, "An Act for the speedy and effectual Recruiting of His Majesty's Land Forces and Marines." (Note: Recruiting Act 1757 (30 Geo. 2. c. 8)) (Repealed by Statute Law Revision Act 1867 (30 & 31 Vict. c. 59))
Discontinuance of Duties (No. 2) Act 1757 (repealed)	30 Geo. 2. c. 14	6 May 1757
An Act for continuing an Act of this present Session of Parliament, intituled, "An Act to discontinue, for a limited Time, the Duties upon Corn and Flour imported; and also upon such Corn, Grain, Meal, Bread, Biscuit, and Flour, as have been, or shall be, taken from the Enemy, and brought into this Kingdom." (Note: Discontinuance of Duties Act 1757 (30 Geo. 2. c. 7)) (Repealed by Statute Law Revision Act 1867 (30 & 31 Vict. c. 59))
Distillation (No. 2) Act 1757 (repealed)	30 Geo. 2. c. 15	6 May 1757
An Act for continuing an Act of this present Session of Parliament, intituled, "An Act to prohibit, for a limited Time, the making Low Wines and Spirits from Wheat, Barley, Malt, or any other Sort of Grain, or from any Meal or Flour." (Note: Distillation Act 1757 (30 Geo. 2. c. 10)) (Repealed by Statute Law Revision Act 1867 (30 & 31 Vict. c. 59))
Importation Act 1757 (repealed)	30 Geo. 2. c. 16	6 May 1757
An Act to extend the Liberty granted by an Act of the Twenty-third Year of the Reign of His present Majesty (Note: Importation, etc. Act 1749 (23 Geo. 2. c. 29)) of importing Bar Iron from His Majesty's Colonies in America into the Port of London, to the rest of the Ports of Great Britain; and for repealing certain Clauses in the said Act. (Repealed by Statute Law Revision Act 1867 (30 & 31 Vict. c. 59))
Importation (No. 2) Act 1757 (repealed)	30 Geo. 2. c. 17	17 May 1757
An Act for the Importation of fine organzined Italian Thrown Silk. (Repealed by Statute Law Revision Act 1867 (30 & 31 Vict. c. 59))
Prize Goods Act 1757 (repealed)	30 Geo. 2. c. 18	28 June 1757
An Act for the Relief and Encouragement of the Captors of Prizes, with respect to the bringing and landing Prize Goods in this Kingdom. (Repealed by Naval Prize Acts Repeal Act 1864 (27 & 28 Vict. c. 23))
National Debt Act 1757 (repealed)	30 Geo. 2. c. 19	28 June 1757
An Act for granting to His Majesty several Rates and Duties upon Indentures, Leases, Bonds, and other Deeds; and upon News Papers, Advertisements, and Almanacks; and upon Licenses for retailing Wine; and upon Coals exported to Foreign Parts, and for applying, from a certain Time, the Sums of Money arising from the Surplus of the Duties on Licenses for retailing Spirituous Liquors; and for raising the Sum of Three Millions by Annuities, to be charged on the said Rates, Duties, and Sums of Money; and for making perpetual an Act made in the Second Year of the Reign of His present Majesty, intituled, "An Act for the better Regulation of Attornies and Solicitors;" (Note: Attorneys and Solicitors Act 1728 (2 Geo. 2. c. 23)) and for enlarging the Time for filing Affidavits of the Execution of Contracts of Clerks to Attornies and Solicitors; and also the Time for Payment of the Duties omitted to be paid for the Indentures and Contracts of Clerks and Apprentices. (Repealed by Statute Law Revision Act 1870 (33 & 34 Vict. c. 69))
Distemper Amongst Cattle Act 1757 (repealed)	30 Geo. 2. c. 20	28 June 1757
An Act more effectually to prevent the spreading of the Distemper now raging among the Horned Cattle in this Kingdom. (Repealed by Statute Law Revision Act 1867 (30 & 31 Vict. c. 59))
Medway Fisheries Act 1757 (repealed)	30 Geo. 2. c. 21	28 June 1757
An Act for the more effectual Preservation and Improvement of the Spawn and Fry of Fish, in the River of Thames and Waters of Medway; and for the better regulating the Fishery thereof. (Repealed by Statute Law (Repeals) Act 1978 (c. 45))
Traffic on Highways Act 1757 (repealed)	30 Geo. 2. c. 22	28 June 1757
An Act to explain and amend an Act made in the Eighteenth Year of His present Majesty's Reign, (Note: Carts on Highways Act 1744 (18 Geo. 2. c. 33)) to prevent the Misbehaviour of the Drivers of Carts in the Streets, in London, Westminster, and the Weekly Bills of Mortality; and for other Purposes in this Act mentioned. (Repealed by London Hackney Carriage Act 1831 (1 & 2 Will. 4. c. 22), Highway Act 1835 (5 & 6 Will. 4. c. 50) and Statute Law Revision Act 1948 (11 & 12 Geo. 6. c. 62))
Supply, etc. Act 1757 (repealed)	30 Geo. 2. c. 23	28 June 1757
An Act for enabling His Majesty to raise the Sum of One Million, for the Uses and Purposes therein mentioned. (Repealed by Statute Law Revision Act 1867 (30 & 31 Vict. c. 59))
Obtaining Money by False Pretences, etc. Act 1757 (repealed)	30 Geo. 2. c. 24	28 June 1757
An Act for the more effectual Punishment of Persons who shall attain, or attempt to attain, Possession of Goods or Money by false or untrue Pretences; for preventing the unlawful Pawning of Goods; for the easy Redemption of Goods pawned; and for preventing Gaming in Publick Houses, by Journeymen, Labourers, Servants, and Apprentices. (Repealed by Statute Law Revision Act 1867 (30 & 31 Vict. c. 59))
Militia Act 1757 (repealed)	30 Geo. 2. c. 25	28 June 1757
An Act for the better Ordering of the Militia Forces, in the several Counties of that Part of Great Britain called England. (Repealed by Statute Law Revision Act 1867 (30 & 31 Vict. c. 59))
Supply, etc. (No. 2) Act 1757 (repealed)	30 Geo. 2. c. 26	28 June 1757
An Act for granting to His Majesty certain Sums of Money out of the Sinking Fund; and applying certain Monies remaining in the Exchequer, and the Savings out of the Monies granted in this Session of Parliament for the Pay of the Troops of Hanover, for the Service of the Year One Thousand Seven Hundred and Fifty-seven; and for further appropriating the Supplies granted in this Session of Parliament; and for Relief of Claud Johnson, with respect to a Bond entered into by him for securing the Duties on Tobacco imported by George Buchanan0 and William Hamilton. (Repealed by Statute Law Revision Act 1867 (30 & 31 Vict. c. 59))
Highways and Turnpike Roads Act 1757 (repealed)	30 Geo. 2. c. 27	28 June 1757
An Act for enlarging the Times for the First Meetings of Commissioners, or Trustees, for putting in Execution certain Acts of this Session of Parliament. (Repealed by Turnpike Roads Act 1766 (7 Geo. 3. c. 40))
Highways and Turnpike Roads (No. 2) Act 1757 (repealed)	30 Geo. 2. c. 28	28 June 1757
An Act to render more effectual the several Laws now in being, for the Amendment and Preservation of the Publick Highways and Turnpike Roads of this Kingdom. (Repealed by Turnpike Roads Act 1766 (7 Geo. 3. c. 40))
Indemnity Act 1757 (repealed)	30 Geo. 2. c. 29	28 June 1757
An Act to indemnify Person who have been guilty of the unlawful importing, landing, or running, of prohibited, uncustomed, or other Goods or Merchandize, upon certain Terms therein mentioned. (Repealed by Statute Law Revision Act 1867 (30 & 31 Vict. c. 59))
Herring Fishery Act 1757 (repealed)	30 Geo. 2. c. 30	28 June 1757
An Act for allowing a further Bounty on Vessels employed in the White Herring Fishery; for giving Liberty to alter the present Form and Size of the Nets used in the said Fishery; and for other Purposes therein mentioned. (Repealed by Statute Law Revision Act 1867 (30 & 31 Vict. c. 59))
Southwark Market Act 1757	30 Geo. 2. c. 31	28 June 1757
An Act to explain, amend, and render more effectual, an Act passed in the Twenty-eighth Year of the Reign of His present Majesty, intituled, "An Act to enable the Churchwardens, Overseers, and Inhabitants, of the Parish of Saint Saviour, in the Borough of Southwark, in the County of Surry, to hold a Market within the said Parish, not interfering with the High Street in the said Borough." (Note: Southwark Market (No. 2) Act 1755 (28 Geo. 2. c. 23))
Wiggenhall Drainage Act 1757 (repealed)	30 Geo. 2. c. 32	28 June 1757
An Act for draining and preserving certain Marsh and Fen Lands and Low Grounds, in the Parish of Wiggenhall Saint Mary Magdalen, in the County of Norfolk. (Repealed by Wiggenhall St. Mary Magdalen Drainage Act 1833 (3 & 4 Will. 4. c. xcvi))
Isle of Ely Drainage Act 1757 (repealed)	30 Geo. 2. c. 33	28 June 1757
An Act for draining and preserving certain Fen Lands and Low Grounds, in the several Parishes of Ramsey, Bury, Wistow, Warboys, Farceitt, Standground, and Water Newton, in the County of Huntingdon, and of Doddington in the Isle of Ely and County of Cambridge. (Repealed by Ramsey (Huntingdonshire) Drainage, etc. Act 1796 (36 Geo. 3. c. 72))
Westminster Bridge Act 1757 (repealed)	30 Geo. 2. c. 34	28 June 1757
An Act to enable the Commissioners for building Westminster Bridge to widen the Street, or Avenue, leading from Cockspur Street to the Passage in Spring Garden, near Saint James's Park. (Repealed by Westminster Bridge Act 1853 (16 & 17 Vict. c. 46))
Brandon and Sams Cut Drain (Drainage) Act 1757 (repealed)	30 Geo. 2. c. 35	28 June 1757
An Act for draining and preserving certain Fen Lands, lying in The South Level, Part of the Great Level of the Fens, commonly called Bedford Level, between Brandon River and Sams's Cut Drain; and for empowering the Governor, Bailiffs, and Commonalty, of the Company of Conservators of the Great Level to sell certain Lands within the said Limits, commonly called Invested Lands. (Repealed by Bedford Level (South Level) Drainage Act 1806 (46 Geo. 3. c. xcv))
March, Cambridge, Isle of Ely Drainage Act 1757	30 Geo. 2. c. 36	28 June 1757
An Act for draining and preserving certain Fen Lands, and Low Grounds, and Commons, in the Townships or Hamlets of March and Wimblington, and in the Parish of Upwell, in the Isle of Ely and County of Cambridge.
Enlargement of Times for Executing Acts Act 1757 (repealed)	30 Geo. 2. c. 37	28 June 1757
An Act for enlarging the Times limited for executing and performing several Provisions, Powers, and Directions, in certain Acts of this Session of Parliament. (Repealed by Statute Law Revision Act 1867 (30 & 31 Vict. c. 59))
Tenbury Roads Act 1757 (repealed)	30 Geo. 2. c. 38	15 February 1757
An Act for amending, widening, and keeping in Repair, several Roads, in and near to the Town of Tenbury, in the Counties of Salop, Worcester, and Hereford. (Repealed by Tenbury and Hereford Roads Act 1823 (4 Geo. 4. c. xxv))
Frome Roads Act 1757 (repealed)	30 Geo. 2. c. 39	15 February 1757
An Act for repairing and widening several Roads leading to, through, and from, the Town of Frome in the County of Somerset; and for giving further Powers to the Trustees in an Act passed in the Twenty-fifth Year of His present Majesty's Reign, (Note: Wiltshire Roads (No. 2) Act 1751 (25 Geo. 2. c. 12)) for repairing the Roads from the Town of Warminster, in the County of Wilts, to the City of Bath, in the County of Somerset, and other Roads therein mentioned. (Repealed by Roads to and through Frome Act 1810 (50 Geo. 3. c. lxii) and Roads to and through Frome Act 1831 (1 & 2 Will. 4. c. lxvi))
Somerset and Wiltshire Roads Act 1757 (repealed)	30 Geo. 2. c. 40	11 March 1757
An Act for enlarging the Terms and Powers granted by Two Acts of Parliament, one passed in the Third, (Note: Warwick Roads Act 1729 (3 Geo. 2. c. 9)) and the other in the Seventeenth, (Note: Warwick Roads Act 1743 (17 Geo. 2. c. 12)) Year of the Reign of His present Majesty, for repairing the Road leading from a Gate called Shipston Toll Gate at Bridgtown in the Parish of Old Stratford in the County of Warwick, through Alderminster and Shipston upon Stower, to the Top of Long Compton Hill in the said County of Warwick; and also for repairing the Road leading from the First Mile Stone standing on the said Shipston Road, through a Lane called Clifford Lane, and through Mickleton and Chipping Campden, to a Place called Andover's Ford in the County of Gloucester. (Repealed by Old Stratford (Warwickshire) and Long Compton Hill Road Act 1818 (58 Geo. 3. c. xxxiv) and Road from Chipping Camden to Old Stratford Act 1818 (58 Geo. 3. c. lxxii))
Wiltshire Roads Act 1757 (repealed)	30 Geo. 2. c. 41	11 March 1757
An Act for amending, widening, and keeping in Repair, the Road from the Turnpike Road at the Bottom of Shaw Hill in the Parish of Melksham, through Googe's Lane, Corsham, Biddestone, and West Yatton, to the Turnpike Road at Upper Combe, in the Parish of Castle Combe, in the County of Wilts. (Repealed by Melksham and Castle Coombe Road Act 1799 (39 Geo. 3. c. xlviii))
Saint Luke, Middlesex (Poor Relief) Act 1757 (repealed)	30 Geo. 2. c. 42	1 April 1757
An Act for the ascertaining and collecting the Poors Rates, and for the better ordering and regulating the Poor, in the Parish of Saint Luke in the County of Middlesex. (Repealed by St. Luke, Middlesex, Poor Relief Act 1808 (48 Geo. 3. c. xcvii))
Hertford and Bedford Roads Act 1757 (repealed)	30 Geo. 2. c. 43	1 April 1757
An Act for amending, widening, and keeping in Repair, the Road from the Town of Hitchin in the County of Hertford, through the Town of Shefford and Carrington Cotton End, to a Lane opposite a Farm-house called Saint Leonard's, leading into the Turnpike Road from St. Alban's to the Town of Bedford; and also the Road from the Turning out of the aforesaid Road into Henlow Field to Gerford Bridge; and also the Road from the Town of Henlow, over Henlow Bridge, to Arlesey in the County of Bedford. (Repealed by Hitchin and Bedford Roads and Branches Act 1813 (53 Geo. 3. c. xciii) and Hitchin, Shefford, Henlow and Gorford Bridge Roads Act 1835 (5 & 6 Will. 4. c. xxxix))
Leicester Roads Act 1757 (repealed)	30 Geo. 2. c. 44	1 April 1757
An Act for amending, widening, and keeping in Repair, the Road leading from Burleigh Bridge in the Town of Loughborough, to Ashby de la Zouch in the County of Leicester. (Repealed by Loughborough, Ashby-de-la-Zouche and Rempstone Road Act 1863 (26 & 27 Vict. c. liii))
Hertford and Broadwater Road Act 1757 (repealed)	30 Geo. 2. c. 45	1 April 1757
An Act for amending, widening, and keeping in Repair, the Roads from the East End of the Town of Hertford in the County of Hertford, through Watton, to Broadwater, and from the Town of Ware, through Watton, to the North End of the Town of Walkern in the said County. (Repealed by Hertford and Broadwater, and Ware and Walkern Roads Act 1820 (1 Geo. 4. c. lxx) and Annual Turnpike Acts Continuance Act 1871 (34 & 35 Vict. c. 115))
Wiltshire and Somerset Roads Act 1757 (repealed)	30 Geo. 2. c. 46	1 April 1757
An Act for amending, widening, making commodious, and keeping in Repair, the Road from The Cross Keys, otherwise Bricker's Barn, in the Parish of Corsham in the County of Wilts, to Bath Easton Bridge in the County of Somerset. (Repealed by Road from Bricker's Barn to the Kingsdown and Batheaston Road Act 1819 (59 Geo. 3. c. xlv))
River Blyth Navigation Act 1757 (repealed)	30 Geo. 2. c. 47	1 April 1757
An Act for making the River Blyth navigable, from Halesworth Bridge, in the County of Suffolk, into the Haven of Southwold. (Repealed by River Blyth Navigation Act Revocation Order 1934 (SR&O 1934/283))
Oxfordshire Roads Act 1757 (repealed)	30 Geo. 2. c. 48	1 April 1757
An Act for repairing and widening the Road from Towcester, through Silverston and Brackley in the County of Northampton, and Ardley and Middleton Stoney, to Weston Gate in the Parish of Weston on the Green in the County of Oxford. (Repealed by Towcester to Weston Gate Road Act 1820 (1 Geo. 4. c. lxxiii))
Leicestershire Roads Act 1757 (repealed)	30 Geo. 2. c. 49	1 April 1757
An Act for repairing and widening the Road from Markfield Turnpike in the County of Leicester, over Charley otherwise Charnwood Forest, through the Town of Whitwick; and from thence, through Talbot Lane, to where the Road leading from the Town of Loughborough to the Town of Ashby de la Zouch in the said County comes in from Ryley Lane, near to a Place called Snape Gate. (Repealed by Markfield Turnpike and Snape Gate Road Act 1826 (7 Geo. 4. c. cxxxiv))
Surrey and Sussex Roads Act 1757 (repealed)	30 Geo. 2. c. 50	6 May 1757
An Act for amending, widening, and keeping in Repair, the Roads leading from the Village of Milford in the County of Surrey, through Petworth, to the Top of Dunckton Hill, and from Petworth to Stopham Bridge in the County of Sussex. (Repealed by Milford, Petworth and Stopham Bridge Roads Act 1820 (1 Geo. 4. c. xliv) and Petworth Turnpike Roads Act 1854 (17 & 18 Vict. c. lxxi))
Huntingdonshire Roads Act 1757 (repealed)	30 Geo. 2. c. 51	6 May 1757
An Act for explaining and amending several Acts of Parliament, for repairing the Roads between a Place called The White Post on Alconbury Hill and Wansford Bridge in the County of Huntingdon, and between Norman Cross Hill in the said County and the City of Peterborough, with respect to the Elections of new Trustees, the Power of compelling Persons employed by the Trustees in the Execution of such Acts, to deliver up such Books and Papers relating thereto as are in their Custody, and also to the Manner of summoning and holding the Meetings of the Trustees. (Repealed by Alconbury Hill and Norman Cross Roads (Huntingdonshire) Act 1798 (38 Geo. 3. c. xlviii))
Northumberland Roads Act 1757 (repealed)	30 Geo. 2. c. 52	6 May 1757
An Act for enlarging the Term and Powers granted by an Act passed in the Twentieth Year of the Reign of His present Majesty, (Note: Northumberland Roads Act 1746 (20 Geo. 2. c. 9)) for repairing the High Road leading from the North End of The Cow Cawsey near the Town of Newcastle upon Tyne, to the Town of Belford, and from thence to Buckton Burn in the County of Northumberland; and for making the same more effectual. (Repealed by Newcastle to Carlisle Road Act 1786 (26 Geo. 3. c. 160))
Reading and Basingstoke Road Act 1757 (repealed)	30 Geo. 2. c. 53	6 May 1757
An Act for enlarging the Term and Powers granted by Two Acts of Parliament, One passed in the Fourth Year of the Reign of His late Majesty King George, (Note: Reading and Basingstoke Road Act 1717 (4 Geo. 1. c. 7 Pr.)) and the other in the Ninth Year of the Reign of His present Majesty, (Note: Reading and Basingstoke Road Act 1735 (9 Geo. 2. c. 16)) for repairing the Highways from Crown Corner (Note: Crown Corner is located in Reading at the junction of the A4 Crown Street/London Road, and the A327 Silver Street/London Street. 51°27′02″N 0°58′01″W) in the Town of Reading, leading by and through the several Parishes of Shinfield and Heckfield, in the several Counties of Berks, Wilts, and Southampton, to Basingstoke in the County of Southampton. (Repealed by Road from Reading to Basingstoke Act 1801 (41 Geo. 3. (U.K.) c. lix))
Yorkshire Roads Act 1757 (repealed)	30 Geo. 2. c. 54	6 May 1757
An Act for enlarging the Terms and Powers granted by Two several Acts passed in the Fourteenth Year of His present Majesty; the One, (Note: Wakefield, etc., Roads Act 1740 (14 Geo. 2. c. 19)) for repairing the Roads from a Place called The Red-house near Doncaster to Wakefield, and, through the said Town of Wakefield, by Dewsbury High Town and Lightcliffe, to the Town of Halifax, in the West Riding of the County of York; and the other, (Note: Yorkshire Roads Act 1740 (14 Geo. 2. c. 23)) for repairing the Road from Wakefield to Pontefract, and from thence to a Place called Weeland in the Township of Hensall, and from Pontefract to Wentbridge in the Township of Darrington in the West Riding of the County of York. (Repealed by Wakefield and Halifax Road Act 1828 (9 Geo. 4. c. lxix) and Doncaster, Wakefield, Pontefract, Weeland and Wentbridge Roads Act 1831 (1 Will. 4. c. xliv))
Preston Bridge Act 1757 (repealed)	30 Geo. 2. c. 55	6 May 1757
An Act for re-building the Bridge over the River Ribble, between the Townships of Preston and Penwortham, near a Place called The Fish-house, in the County Palatine of Lancaster. (Repealed by Penwortham Bridge Act 1912 (2 & 3 Geo. 5. c. xi))
Warwick Shire Hall Act 1757	30 Geo. 2. c. 56	6 May 1757
An Act for re-building and keeping in Repair the Shire Hall of the County of Warwick.
Ayr Roads Act 1757 (repealed)	30 Geo. 2. c. 57	6 May 1757
An Act for enlarging the Term and Powers granted by an Act passed in the Twenty-sixth Year of the Reign of His present Majesty, intituled, "An Act for repairing several Roads leading into the City of Glasgow," (Note: Glasgow Roads Act 1753 (26 Geo. 2. c. 90)) so far as the same relates to certain Roads mentioned in the said Act; and also to enlarge the Term and Powers granted by an Act passed in the Twenty-seventh Year of the Reign of His present Majesty, (Note: Glasgow Roads Act 1754 (27 Geo. 2. c. 27)) intituled, "An Act to explain, amend, and render more effectual, an Act passed in the Twenty-sixth Year of the Reign of His present Majesty, intituled, 'An Act for repairing several Roads leading into the City of Glasgow,'" and to repair several other Roads leading into the said City; and for building a Bridge cross the River of Inchinnan. (Repealed by Roads and Bridges (Scotland) Act 1878 (41 & 42 Vict. c. 51) and Local Government (Scotland) Act 1889 (52 & 53 Vict. c. 50))
Southwold Harbour Act 1757 (repealed)	30 Geo. 2. c. 58	6 May 1757
An Act for enlarging the Term, and amending and altering several Powers, granted by an Act made in the Twentieth Year of His present Majesty's Reign, (Note: Southwold Harbour Act 1746 (20 Geo. 2. c. 14)) for opening, cleansing, repairing, and improving, the Haven of Southwould, in the County of Suffolk. (Repealed by Southwold Harbour Act 1830 (11 Geo. 4 & 1 Will. 4. c. xlviii))
River Lea Bridge and Roads Act 1757 (repealed)	30 Geo. 2. c. 59	6 May 1757
An Act for building a Bridge over the River Lea, at or near a Place called Jeremy's Ferry; (Note: Jeremy's Ferry is now known as Lea Bridge. 51°33′44″N 0°02′44″W) and for making, repairing, and widening, Roads from thence into the great Roads at Snaresbrooke in the County of Essex, and at Clapton in the County of Middlesex. (Repealed by Metropolis Roads Act 1826 (7 Geo. 4. c. cxlii))
Guildford and Arundel Road Act 1757 (repealed)	30 Geo. 2. c. 60	6 May 1757
An Act for repairing and widening the Road from the North End of Dapdon Wharf, in the Parish of Stoke next Guldeford, through Guldeford, to Andrew's Cross and to Alford Bars in the County of Surrey, and from thence to Saint Mary's Gate in Arundel in the County of Sussex. (Repealed by Alfold Bars and Newbridge Road Act 1821 (1 & 2 Geo. 4. c. xxxv), Guildford and Alfold Bars Road Act 1829 (10 Geo. 4. c. lxiv) and Annual Turnpike Acts Continuance Act 1867 (30 & 31 Vict. c. 121))
Surrey and Southampton Roads Act 1757 (repealed)	30 Geo. 2. c. 61	6 May 1757
An Act for repairing the Road from a Place called The Golden Farmer (Note: The Golden Farmer Inn, later named the Jolly Farmer, was located at the junction of the A325 and A30 between Camberley and Bagshot. 51°20′56″N 0°42′48″W) near Bagshot in the County of Surrey, to Hertford Bridge Hill (Note: The village of Hartfordbridge in Hampshire.) in the County of Southampton. (Repealed by Bagshot and Basingstoke and Odiham Roads Act 1819 (59 Geo. 3. c. vii))
River Ivel Navigation Act 1757	30 Geo. 2. c. 62	17 May 1757
An Act for making the River Ivel and the Branches thereof navigable, from the River Ouze at Tempsford in the County of Bedford, to Shotling Mill otherwise called Burnt Mill in the Parish of Hitchin in the County of Hertford, and to Black Horse Mill, in the Parish of Bygrave in the said County of Hertford, and to the South and North Bridges in the Town of Shefford in the said County of Bedford.
Old Brentford Bridge Act 1757 (repealed)	30 Geo. 2. c. 63	28 June 1757
An Act for building a Bridge or Bridges cross the River of Thames, from a certain Place in Old Brentford in the Parish of Ealing in the County of Middlesex, known by the Name of Smith of Smith's Hill, to the opposite Shore in the County of Surry. (Repealed by Statute Law Revision Act 1948 (11 & 12 Geo. 6. c. 62))
Worcester, Warwick and Gloucester Roads Act 1757 (repealed)	30 Geo. 2. c. 64	28 June 1757
An Act for enlarging the Terms and Powers granted by Two Acts of Parliament of the First (Note: Evesham Roads Act 1727 (1 Geo. 2. St. 2. c. 11)) and Seventeenth (Note: Worcester Roads Act 1743 (17 Geo. 2. c. 13)) Years of the Reign of His present Majesty, for repairing and amending several Roads leading to and from the Borough of Evesham in the County of Worcester; and for explaining and making more effectual the said Acts; and also for amending, widening, and keeping in Repair, several other Roads in the Counties of Worcester, Warwick, and Gloucester. (Repealed by Evesham Roads Act 1822 (3 Geo. 4. c. lxix))
Bath (Streets, Buildings, Watch, etc.) Act 1757 (repealed)	30 Geo. 2. c. 65	28 June 1757
An Act for cleansing, paving, and lightening, the Streets of the City of Bath and Liberties thereof; and for regulating the Chairmen, and also for the keeping a sufficient and well-regulated Watch in the Night-time, in the said City and Liberties; and to oblige all Owners of Houses and other Buildings within the said City and Liberties to bring down the Water from the Roofs of their Houses and other Buildings, by proper Pipes, down the Sides or Walls of such Houses and Buildings; and also to oblige all Coal Carriages to pass by the Borough Walls of the said City, during the Night Season. (Repealed by Bath (Improvement) Act 1766 (6 Geo. 3. c. 70) and Walcot, Somerset Improvement Act 1793 (33 Geo. 3. c. 89))
Poole Roads Act 1757 (repealed)	30 Geo. 2. c. 66	28 June 1757
An Act to explain, amend, and render more effectual, an Act made in the last Session of Parliament, (Note: Poole Roads Act 1756 (29 Geo. 2. c. 52)) for repairing and widening several Roads, leading from a Gate called Poole Gate, in the Town and County of Poole. (Repealed by Poole Roads Act 1777 (17 Geo. 3. c. 104))
Bath Roads Act 1757 (repealed)	30 Geo. 2. c. 67	28 June 1757
An Act for enlarging the Terms and Powers granted by an Act passed in the Twelfth Year of the Reign of His present Majesty, (Note: Bath Roads, Streets, etc. Act 1738 (12 Geo. 2. c. 20)) for repairing and enlarging the Highways between the Top of Kingsdown Hill (Note: Kingsdown Hill is adjacent to Kingsdown in Somerset. 51°24′10″N 2°16′12″W) and the City of Bath; and for amending several other Highways therein mentioned, leading to the said City; and also for repairing several other Roads therein mentioned. (Repealed by Bath Roads Act 1793 (33 Geo. 3. c. 144))
Lincoln and Northampton Roads Act 1757 (repealed)	30 Geo. 2. c. 68	28 June 1757
An Act for repairing and widening the Roads leading from Spalding High Bridge, (Note: High Bridge in Spalding, Lincolnshire carries a road across the River Welland between the B1172 Bridge Street and the B1173 High Street/Church Gate. 52°47′10″N 0°09′00″W) through Littleworth, (Note: Littleworth is just to the south of Deeping St Nicholas. 52°43′19″N 0°12′39″W) and by Frognall, (Note: Frognall 52°40′44″N 0°17′02″W) and over James Deeping Stone Bridge, (Note: The stone bridge in Deeping St James carries the B1162 over the River Welland to join the B1166 Bridge Street. 52°40′16″N 0°17′59″W) in the County of Lincoln, to Maxey Outgang (Note: The village of Maxey, Cambridgeshire. 52°39′35″N 0°19′44″W) in the County of Northampton, adjoining to the High Road (Note: High Street, Maxey, Cambridgeshire.) there. (Repealed by Spalding, James Deeping Stone Bridge and Maxey Outgang Road Act 1821 (1 & 2 Geo. 4. c. xxxiv))
Denbigh and Carnarvon Roads Act 1757 (repealed)	30 Geo. 2. c. 69	28 June 1757
An Act for amending, widening, and keeping in Repair, the Roads from the Town of Wrexham in the County of Denbigh, to Pentre Bridge in the County of Flint, and from the Town of Mold, to Northop, Holywell, and Rhuddlan, in the same County, and from thence to The Ferryhouse opposite the Town of Conway in the County of Carnarvon, and from Ruthin to the said Town of Mold. (Repealed by Ruthin and Mold Roads Act 1822 (3 Geo. 4. c. xli) and Annual Turnpike Acts Continuance Act 1876 (39 & 40 Vict. c. 39))

=== Private acts ===
Short title	Citation	Royal assent
Long title
Cramer's Name Act 1757	30 Geo. 2. c. 1 Pr.	19 January 1757
An Act to enable Oliver Cramer Esquire and the Heirs of his Body to take and use the Surname of Coghill, pursuant to the Will of Marmaduke Coghill Esquire, deceased; and to bear the Family Arms of Coghill.
Collier's Name Act 1757	30 Geo. 2. c. 2 Pr.	19 January 1757
An Act to enable the Reverend Thomas Collier Clerk and his Issue to take and use the Surname of Barnard.
Naturalization of John Baptist Durand and Bartholomew Rilliet Act 1757	30 Geo. 2. c. 3 Pr.	19 January 1757
An Act for naturalizing John Baptist Durand and Bartholomew Rilliet.
Falwasser's Naturalization Act 1757	30 Geo. 2. c. 4 Pr.	19 January 1757
An Act for naturalizing John Frederick Falwasser.
Prior's Hardwick Inclosure Act 1757	30 Geo. 2. c. 5 Pr.	15 February 1757
An Act for dividing and enclosing the Common Fields, Common Pastures, Common Meadows, Common Grounds, and Greens, in the Manor and Parish of Prior's Hardwick, in the County of Warwick.
Barton Stacey Inclosure Act 1757	30 Geo. 2. c. 6 Pr.	15 February 1757
An Act for confirming and establishing certain Articles of Agreement, and an Award, for dividing and enclosing the Common Fields, Common Downs, Meadows, and Pastures, within the Manor of Barton Stacy, in the Parish of Barton Stacy, in the County of Southampton.
Burchester or Burcester or Bissiter Market End (Oxfordshire) inclosure and extinguishing all right of common in certain meadows, pastures and inclosed grounds in said township.	30 Geo. 2. c. 7 Pr.	15 February 1757
An Act for dividing and enclosing the Common Field, Common Meadows, Common Pastures, Common Grounds, and Commonable Lands, in the Township of Burchester, otherwise Burcester, otherwise Bisseter Market End, in the County of Oxford; and for extinguishing all Right of Common in certain Common Meadows, Common Pastures, and Enclosed Grounds, in the said Township.
Trentham Inclosure Act 1757	30 Geo. 2. c. 8 Pr.	11 March 1757
An Act for confirming and establishing Two several Articles of Agreement, for enclosing and dividing Northwood, Hanchurch Heath, and Toft Green, in the Manor and Parish of Trentham, in the County of Stafford.
Whitgift Inclosure Act 1757	30 Geo. 2. c. 9 Pr.	11 March 1757
An Act for dividing and enclosing a certain Piece of Pasture Ground, called Whitgift Pasture, in the County of York; and for giving a Compensation, in Lieu of Tithes, to the Impropriator of the Rectory of Whitgift aforesaid.
Varying and postponing certain limitations in a grant made by Charles II of a duty on coals in the river Tyne, to Charles Duke of Richmond and Lenox; and enabling the present Duke of Richmond, Lenox and Aubigny to make a jointure on his intended marriage to Lady Mary Bruce.	30 Geo. 2. c. 10 Pr.	1 April 1757
An Act for varying and postponing certain Limitations in a Grant made by King Charles the Second, of a Duty on Coals shipped in the River Tyne, to Charles late Duke of Richmond and Lenox; and for enabling the present Duke of Richmond, Lenox, and Aubigny, to make a Jointure, on his intended Marriage with Lady Mary Bruce.
Settling a yearly sum upon Ann Fitzroy, Countess of Euston, out of certain yearly pensions issuing out of hereditary revenue of excise and comprised in letters patent dated 22 October in the 25th year of the reign of Charles II, in part of the jointure agreed to be secured to her upon her intermarriage with Augustus Fitzroy Earl of Euston.	30 Geo. 2. c. 11 Pr.	1 April 1757
An Act for settling a certain Yearly Sum upon the Right Honourable Ann Fitzroy, commonly called Countess of Euston, Wife of the Right Honourable Augustus Fitzroy Esquire, commonly called Earl of Euston, out of certain Yearly Pensions issuing out of the Hereditary Revenue of the Excise, and comprized in certain Letters Patent bearing Date the Two and Twentieth Day of October in the Twenty-sixth Year of the Reign of King Charles the Second, in Part of the Jointure agreed to be secured to her, upon her Inter-marriage with the said Right Honourable Augustus Fitzroy Esquire, commonly called Earl of Euston.
Eddystone Lighthouse Act 1757	30 Geo. 2. c. 12 Pr.	1 April 1757
An Act for vesting the Estate and Interest late of Robert Cheatham Esquire, deceased, in the Duties granted by certain Acts of Parliament, for maintaining a Light-house on The Edystone Rock, in Trustees, in Trust to raise Money, to be applied towards rebuilding the said Light-house.
Empowering Warden and Society of The King's Town Sutton Coldfield (Warwickshire) to grant Sutton Coldfield Park to Simon Luttrell and heirs.	30 Geo. 2. c. 13 Pr.	1 April 1757
An Act to empower the Wardens and Society of The King's Town of Sutton Coldfield, in the County of Warwick, to grant Part of a Common, called Sutton Coldfield Park, unto Simon Luttrell Esquire and his Heirs.
Jeffreys' Estate Act 1757	30 Geo. 2. c. 14 Pr.	1 April 1757
An Act to enable Mary Jeffreys, the Wife of Jeffrey Jeffreys Esquire, a Lunatick, and the Committee or committees of his Estate for the Time being, to make Leases of the Parts and Shares of the said Mary Jeffreys of divers Lands, Tenements, and Hereditaments, in the County of Devon, devised by the Will of Sir William Morice, deceased, during the Continuance of the said Lunatick's Interest therein.
Stragglethorpe Inclosure Act 1757	30 Geo. 2. c. 15 Pr.	1 April 1757
An Act for establishing and rendering effectual certain Articles of Agreement, for enclosing the Common Fields and Grounds, in the Manor of Stragglethorpe, within the Parish of Beckingham, in the County of Lincoln; and for making a Compensation to the Rector of the said Parish, for the Glebe Lands and Tithes in Stragglethorpe aforesaid.
Earlstone Inclosure Act 1757	30 Geo. 2. c. 16 Pr.	1 April 1757
An Act for dividing, alloting, and enclosing, the Common, Open, and Arable Fields and Waste Grounds, in Earlstone, in the Parish of Burghcleare, in the County of Hants.
Piddington Inclosure Act 1757	30 Geo. 2. c. 17 Pr.	1 April 1757
An Act for dividing and enclosing the Common Fields, Common Meadows, Common Pastures, Common Grounds, and Commonable Lands, within the Township of Piddington, in the County of Oxford.
Wingerworth and Tupton Inclosure Act 1757	30 Geo. 2. c. 18 Pr.	1 April 1757
An Act for dividing and enclosing certain Common Pastures and Common Grounds, in the Manor and Parish of Wingerworth, and in the Hamlet of Tupton in the Parish of North Wingfield, respectively, in the County of Derby.
Turner's Name Act 1757	30 Geo. 2. c. 19 Pr.	1 April 1757
An Act to enable Thomas Turner Esquire and his Issue to take and use the Surname and Arms of Payler.
Thompsons' Naturalization Act 1757	30 Geo. 2. c. 20 Pr.	1 April 1757
An Act for naturalizing John Jacob Thomsons.
Earl of Coventry's Estate Act 1757	30 Geo. 2. c. 21 Pr.	6 May 1757
An Act for vesting the settled Estate of George William Earl of Coventry, in the County of Cambridge, in Trustees, in Trust, to sell the same; and to lay out the Money arising by such Sale in the Purchase of other Lands and Hereditaments, lying nearer to his Estate in the Counties of Worcester, Gloucester, and Warwick, to be settled to the Uses therein mentioned.
Lord Trevor's Estate Act 1757	30 Geo. 2. c. 22 Pr.	6 May 1757
An Act for discharging John Lord Trevor, Executor of Thomas Lord Trevor, deceased, from the Sum of Eight Thousand and Eight Hundred Pounds, agreed by the said Thomas Lord Trevor to be laid out in the Purchase of Lands; and for confirming the Application made by the said John Lord Trevor of the said Eight Thousand and Eight Hundred Pounds, towards the Discharge of the Sum of Ten Thousand Pounds, charged on the Manor of Bromham, and other the Estates late of the said Thomas Lord Trevor, in the County of Bedford.
Henry Lord Arundell's and Thomas Arundell's estates: empowering guardians to make leases and copyhold grants during their minority.	30 Geo. 2. c. 23 Pr.	6 May 1757
An Act for empowering the Guardians of Henry Lord Arundell of Wardour and Thomas Arundell his Brother, both Infants, to make Leases and Copyhold Grants of their several Estates, during their respective Minorities.
Viscount Irwin's Estate Act 1757	30 Geo. 2. c. 24 Pr.	6 May 1757
An Act for empowering Henry Viscount Irwin, George Ingram his Brother, and Charles Ingram his Nephew, to settle Part of the said Viscount Irwin's Estate, upon the Marriage of the said Charles Ingram; and for other Purposes therein mentioned.
Glasgow University Benefactions Act 1757	30 Geo. 2. c. 25 Pr.	6 May 1757
An Act for regulating and improving certain Benefactions, vested in the Rector, Principal, Professors, and Masters, of the University and College of Glasgow.
Shaw's Estate Act 1757	30 Geo. 2. c. 26 Pr.	6 May 1757
An Act to empower Sir John Shaw Baronet to make a Partition, during the Minority of John Shaw his Infant Son, of certain Premises devised to him by the Will of Dame Anna Maria Shaw Widow, deceased.
Chasin's Estate Act 1757	30 Geo. 2. c. 27 Pr.	6 May 1757
An Act for Sale of Part of the settled Estates of George Chasin the Elder and George Chasin the Younger, Esquires, in the Counties of Dorset and Somerset, for Payment of their Debts; and for rendering a Power in a certain Settlement therein mentioned for making Jointures more effectual; and for other Purposes.
Bagster's Estate Act 1757	30 Geo. 2. c. 28 Pr.	6 May 1757
An Act for vesting certain Tithes and Hereditaments in the Isle of Wight, the Estate and Inheritance of Thomas Bagster Esquire, a Lunatick, in Trustees, to be sold, for discharging Encumbrances affecting the same; and for other Purposes therein mentioned.
Fysher's Estate Act 1757	30 Geo. 2. c. 29 Pr.	6 May 1757
An Act for confirming the Title of William Welby Esquire to certain Lands and Hereditaments in the County of Lincoln, purchased of Francis Fysher Esquire; and for vesting and settling other Estates of the said Francis Fysher, in the said County, upon the Trusts, and for the Purposes, therein mentioned.
Montgomerie's Estate Act 1757	30 Geo. 2. c. 30 Pr.	6 May 1757
An Act to enable Lilias Montgomerie of Skelmorly to sell Lands in the County of Renfrew; and to lay out the Money arising thereby in the Purchase of Lands contiguous to other Lands of the said Lilias Montgomerie, in the County of Air; and for other Purposes therein mentioned.
Hearle's Estate Act 1757	30 Geo. 2. c. 31 Pr.	6 May 1757
An Act for enabling Mary Hearle Widow, Thomas Hearle Clerk, and John Rogers Esquire, Guardians of Margaret Hearle, Jane Hearle, Betty Hearle, and Harriet Hearle, Infants, to make Leases of several Estates in the County of Cornwall, and also Setts and Leases of the Mines therein, and to carry on Adventures, during the Minority of the said Infants.
Bishopthorpe Inclosure Act 1757	30 Geo. 2. c. 32 Pr.	6 May 1757
An Act for establishing and rendering effectual certain Articles of Agreement, for the dividing and enclosing the Common Fields, Common Meadow Grounds, and Common or Waste, in the Township of Bishopthorpe, in the County of the City of York; and for other Purposes therein mentioned.
Wolfhampcote Inclosure Act 1757	30 Geo. 2. c. 33 Pr.	6 May 1757
An Act for dividing and enclosing certain Common Fields, Common Pastures, Common Meadows, Common Grounds, and Waste Grounds, within the Parish of Wolfhampcote, in the County of Warwick.
West Matfen Inclosure Act 1757	30 Geo. 2. c. 34 Pr.	6 May 1757
An Act for confirming and establishing Articles of Agreement, for dividing and enclosing the Open Town Fields of West Matfen, and a small Common or Waste Ground thereto adjoining, in the County of Northumberland.
Priors Marston Inclosure Act 1757	30 Geo. 2. c. 35 Pr.	6 May 1757
An Act for dividing and enclosing the Common Fields, Common Pastures, Common Meadows, Common Grounds, and Waste Grounds, in the Manor and Lordship of Pryor's Marston, in the County of Warwick.
Fulford Inclosure Act 1757	30 Geo. 2. c. 36 Pr.	6 May 1757
An Act for dividing and enclosing certain Fields, Meadows, and Commons, in the Manor of Fulford, in the County of York.
Strensall Inclosure Act 1757	30 Geo. 2. c. 37 Pr.	6 May 1757
An Act for dividing and enclosing a Parcel of Common Ground, in the Manor of Strensall, in the County of York; and for giving Compensation to the Prebendary of Strensall aforesaid and his Farmer, and the Vicar of Strensall, in Lieu of their respective Tithes and Ecclesiastical Dues, out of the said Parcel of Ground.
Establishing and rendering more effectual an agreement concerning Pocklington (Yorkshire) inclosure.	30 Geo. 2. c. 38 Pr.	6 May 1757
An Act for establishing and rendering effectual Articles of Agreement, for dividing and enclosing the Open Fields and Common Grounds, in Pocklington, in the County of York.
Bishop Thornton with Bishopside Inclosure Act 1757	30 Geo. 2. c. 39 Pr.	6 May 1757
An Act for dividing and enclosing Thornton otherwise Bishop Thornton Moor, Stinted Pasture, or Common, within the Manor of Bishop Thornton with Bishopside, in the County of York.
Loxley Inclosure Act 1757	30 Geo. 2. c. 40 Pr.	6 May 1757
An Act for dividing and enclosing several Open and Arable Meadow and Pasture Grounds, in the Parish of Loxley, in the County of Warwick.
Baumber Inclosure Act 1757	30 Geo. 2. c. 41 Pr.	6 May 1757
An Act for dividing and enclosing the Common Fields, Grounds, and Meadows, in the Manor and Parish of Baumber, otherwise Bamburgh, in the County of Lincoln.
Weir's Divorce Act 1757	30 Geo. 2. c. 42 Pr.	6 May 1757
An Act to dissolve the Marriage of the Honourable Charles Hope Weir Esquire with Ann Vane his now Wife; and to enable him to marry again; and for other Purposes therein mentioned.
Nuthall's Divorce Act 1757	30 Geo. 2. c. 43 Pr.	6 May 1757
An Act to dissolve the Marriage of Thomas Nuthall Gentleman with Lucy Scott his now Wife; and to enable him to marry again; and for other Purposes therein mentioned.
Durade's Naturalization Act 1757	30 Geo. 2. c. 44 Pr.	6 May 1757
An Act for naturalizing John Durade.
Ascertaining, establishing and confirming North Mimms and Northaw (Hertfordshire) parish boundaries.	30 Geo. 2. c. 45 Pr.	17 May 1757
An Act to ascertain, establish, and confirm, the Boundaries of the Manors and Parishes of North Mims and Northaw, so far as the same extend to and upon the several Commons called North Mims and Northaw Common, in the County of Hertford.
Charterhouse Hospital Estate Act 1757	30 Geo. 2. c. 46 Pr.	17 May 1757
An Act to enable the Governors of the Hospital of King James, founded in Charter-house, to sell and convey the Manor of Blacktoft, and divers Lands and Tenements, in the County of York; and for laying out the Money arising thereby in the Purchase of other Lands and Tenements, for the Benefit of the said Hospital.
Ward's Estate Act 1757	30 Geo. 2. c. 47 Pr.	17 May 1757
An Act to enable the Guardian of Charles Ward, an Infant, to sell and convey Part of his Estate in the County of Warwick, pursuant to an Agreement with the Right Honourable Francis Earl Brooke; and for applying the Purchase-money in Discharge of Encumbrances affecting the same.
Molineux's Estate Act 1757	30 Geo. 2. c. 48 Pr.	17 May 1757
An Act for carrying into Execution Articles of Agreement, entered into before, and in Consideration of, the Marriage of Crispe Molineux Esquire with Katherine Montgomerie his now Wife.
Aynscombe's Estate Act 1757	30 Geo. 2. c. 49 Pr.	17 May 1757
An Act for vesting the settled Estates of Lillie Smith Aynscombe Esquire and Valentina his Wife in Trustees, to be sold; and for applying the Money arising by such Sale in the Purchase of other Freehold Lands, Tenements, and Hereditaments, to be settled and limited to the like Uses; and for other Purposes in the said Act mentioned.
Vince's Estate Act 1757	30 Geo. 2. c. 50 Pr.	17 May 1757
An Act for vesting Part of the Real Estate of Henry Chivers Vince Esquire, deceased, in Trustees, to be sold, for raising Money to discharge the Debts and Encumbrances directed to be paid by a Decree of the Court of Chancery.
Davison's Estate Act 1757	30 Geo. 2. c. 51 Pr.	17 May 1757
An Act for vesting divers Messuages, Lands, and Hereditaments, Part of the Real Estate late of George Davison, deceased, in Trustees, to enable them to convey the same to the Purchasers or Mortgagees thereof, or unto such other Person or Persons as the Court of Chancery shall direct.
Moreton Morrell Inclosure Act 1757	30 Geo. 2. c. 52 Pr.	17 May 1757
An Act for dividing and enclosing certain Open and Common Fields, lying within the Parish or Township of Morton, otherwise Morton Morrell, in the County of Warwick.
Wymeswold Inclosure Act 1757	30 Geo. 2. c. 53 Pr.	17 May 1757
An Act for dividing and enclosing several Commons or Wastes, and also several Common Fields, Meadows, Pastures, and Waste Grounds, lying within the Manor of Wimeswould, in the County of Leicester.
Confirmation of a partition between William Earl and Frances Katherine, Countess of Dartmouth, and Sir William Maynard, of estates in Buckinghamshire, Middlesex, Surrey, Suffolk, Hertfordshire and City of London.	30 Geo. 2. c. 54 Pr.	28 June 1757
An Act for confirming a Partition between William Earl of Dartmouth and Frances Katherine Countess of Dartmouth his Wife, and Sir William Maynard Baronet, of several Estates, in the Counties of Bucks, Middlesex, Surry, Suffolk, and Hertford, and in the City of London; and for vesting and settling the entire Premises to the several Uses therein mentioned.
Carr's Estate Act 1757	30 Geo. 2. c. 55 Pr.	28 June 1757
An Act to empower Elizabeth the Wife of Henry Thomas Carr Esquire, a Lunatick, to make an Appointment of a Sum of Three Thousand Pounds, towards the Payment of the said Lunatick's Debts; and for other Purposes therein mentioned.
Thompson's Estate Act 1757	30 Geo. 2. c. 56 Pr.	28 June 1757
An Act for Sale of Part of the settled Estate of William Thomson Esquire, in the County of Berks, to raise Money, towards discharging several Mortgage Debts and Encumbrances affecting other Parts of his settled Estates in the same County.
Empowering the Receiver General of the King's customs to release the estate and effects of George Buchanan and William Hamilton from a debt due to the King, upon payment, by the assignees under the commission of bankruptcy against them, of a sum of money therein mentioned.	30 Geo. 2. c. 57 Pr.	28 June 1757
An Act for empowering the Receiver General of His Majesty's Customs to release and discharge the Estate and Effects of George Buchanan and William Hamilton from a Debt due to His Majesty, upon Payment, by the Assignees under the Commission of Bankruptcy against them, of a Sum of Money therein mentioned.
Jackson's Name Act 1757	30 Geo. 2. c. 58 Pr.	28 June 1757
An Act to enable Samuel Jackson Esquire, now called Samuel Dodington, and his Heirs Male, to take and use, in Exchange for his and their own Surname and Arms, the Surname and Arms of Dodington, pursuant to the Will of George Dodington Esquire, deceased.
Newsam's Name Act 1757	30 Geo. 2. c. 59 Pr.	28 June 1757
An Act to enable James Newsam Esquire, and his Issue, to take and use the Surname of Craggs.

=== Sources ===
- Pickering, Danby, ed. (1766). "Anno tricesimo Georgii II". The Statutes at Large. Vol. 22: From the 30th to the 33d Year of King George II. Cambridge: Joseph Bentham. pp. 1–196 – via Internet Archive.
- Pickering, Danby, ed. (1766). "Anno tricesimo Georgii II". The Statutes at Large. Vol. 22: From the 30th to the 33d Year of King George II. Cambridge: Joseph Bentham. pp. 1–196 – via Google Books.
- Pickering, Danby, ed. (1766). "Anno tricesimo Georgii II". The Statutes at Large. Vol. 22: From the 30th to the 33d Year of King George II. Cambridge: Joseph Bentham. pp. 1–196 – via Internet Archive.
- Journals of the House of Commons. Vol. 27. London: His Majesty's Stationery Office. 1803. pp. 621–927 – via Google Books.
- Chronological Table of and Index to the Statutes. Vol. 1: To the End of the Session 59 Vict. Sess. 2 (1895) (13th ed.). London: Her Majesty's Stationery Office. 1896. pp. 117–118 – via Google Books.

== 31 Geo. 2 ==
The fifth session of the 11th Parliament of Great Britain, which met from 1 December 1757 until 20 June 1758.

This session was also traditionally cited as 31 G. 2.

=== Public acts ===
Short title	Citation	Royal assent
Long title
Continuance of Laws, etc. Act 1757 (repealed)	31 Geo. 2. c. 1	9 December 1757
An Act for continuing certain Laws made in the last Session of Parliament, for prohibiting the Exportation of Corn, Malt, Meal, Flour, Bread, Biscuit, and Starch; and for prohibiting the making of Low Wines and Spirits from Wheat, Barley, Malt, or any other Sort of Grain, or from Meal or Flour; and to allow the Transportation of Wheat, Barley, Oats, Meal, and Flour, to The Isle of Man, for the Use of the Inhabitants there; and for reviving and continuing an Act made in the same Session, (Note: Discontinuance of Duties Act 1757 (30 Geo. 2. c. 7)) for discontinuing the Duties upon Corn and Flour imported, and upon Corn, Grain, Meal, Bread, Biscuit, and Flour, taken from the Enemy; and to permit the Importation of Corn and Flour into Great Britain and Ireland in Neutral Ships; and to authorize His Majesty, with the Advice of His Privy Council, to order and permit the Exportation of such Quantities of the Commodities aforesaid as may be necessary for the Sustentation of any Forces in the Pay of Great Britain, or of those of His Majesty's Allies acting in Support of the common Cause; and to prohibit the Payment of any Bounty upon the Exportation of any of the said Commodities to be made during the Continuance of this Act. (Repealed by Statute Law Revision Act 1867 (30 & 31 Vict. c. 59))
Taxation (No. 2) Act 1757 (repealed)	31 Geo. 2. c. 2	23 December 1757
An Act for continuing, and granting to His Majesty, certain Duties upon Malt, Mum, Cyder, and Perry, for the Service of the Year One Thousand Seven Hundred and Fifty-eight. (Repealed by Statute Law Revision Act 1867 (30 & 31 Vict. c. 59))
Importation (No. 3) Act 1757 (repealed)	31 Geo. 2. c. 3	23 December 1757
An Act for allowing the Importation of such fine Italian Organzine Silk into this Kingdom, from any Port or Place whatsoever, as shall have been shipped on or before the Day therein mentioned. (Repealed by Statute Law Revision Act 1867 (30 & 31 Vict. c. 59))
Land Tax (No. 2) Act 1757 (repealed)	31 Geo. 2. c. 4	23 December 1757
An Act for granting an Aid to His Majesty, by a Land Tax, to be raised in Great Britain, for the Service of the Year One Thousand Seven Hundred and Fifty-eight; and for enforcing the Payment of the Rates to be assessed upon Somerset House in The Strand. (Repealed by Statute Law Revision Act 1867 (30 & 31 Vict. c. 59))
Mutiny (No. 2) Act 1757 (repealed)	31 Geo. 2. c. 5	23 March 1758
An Act for punishing Mutiny and Desertion; and for the better Payment of the Army and their Quarters. (Repealed by Statute Law Revision Act 1867 (30 & 31 Vict. c. 59))
Marine Mutiny (No. 2) Act 1757 (repealed)	31 Geo. 2. c. 6	23 March 1758
An Act for the Regulation of His Majesty's Marine Forces while on Shore. (Repealed by Statute Law Revision Act 1867 (30 & 31 Vict. c. 59))
Land Tax (Commissioners) Act 1757 (repealed)	31 Geo. 2. c. 7	23 March 1758
An Act for appointing Commissioners for putting in Execution an Act of this Session of Parliament, intituled, "An Act for granting an Aid to His Majesty, by a Land Tax, to be raised in Great Britain, for the Service of the Year One Thousand Seven Hundred and Fifty-eight; and for enforcing the Payment of the Rates to be assessed upon Somerset House in The Strand;" (Note: Land Tax (No. 2) Act 1757 (31 Geo. 2. c. 4)) and for rectifying a Mistake in the said Act; and for allowing further Time to the Receivers of certain Aids, for settling Insuper for Monies in Arrear. (Repealed by Statute Law Revision Act 1867 (30 & 31 Vict. c. 59))
Dover Harbour Act 1757 (repealed)	31 Geo. 2. c. 8	23 March 1758
An Act for enlarging the Terms and Powers granted and continued by several Acts of Parliament, for repairing the Harbour of Dover, in the County of Kent. (Repealed by Dover Harbour Act 1828 (9 Geo. 4. c. xxxi))
Indemnity (No. 2) Act 1757 (repealed)	31 Geo. 2. c. 9	13 April 1758
An Act to indemnify Persons who have omitted to qualify themselves for Offices and Employments; and to indemnify Justices of the Peace and others, who have omitted to register their Qualifications within the Time limited by Law; and for giving further Time for those Purposes, and the filing of Affidavits of Articles of Clerkship. (Repealed by Statute Law Revision Act 1867 (30 & 31 Vict. c. 59))
Navy Act 1757 (repealed)	31 Geo. 2. c. 10	9 June 1758
An Act for the Encouragement of Seamen employed in the Royal Navy; and for establishing a regular Method for the punctual, frequent, and certain Payment of their Wages; and for enabling them more easily and readily to remit the same, for the Support of their Wives and Families; and for preventing Frauds and Abuses attending such Payments. (Repealed by Pay of the Navy Act 1830 (11 Geo. 4 & 1 Will. 4. c. 20))
Apprentices (Settlement) Act 1757 (repealed)	31 Geo. 2. c. 11	9 June 1758
An Act to amend an Act made in the Third Year of the Reign of King William and Queen Mary, intituled, "An Act for the better Explanation, and supplying the Defects, of the former Laws for the Settlement of the Poor," (Note: Poor Relief Act 1691 (3 Will. & Mar. c. 11)) so far as the same relates to Apprentices gaining a Settlement by Indenture; and also to empower Justices of the Peace to determine Differences between Masters and Mistresses and their Servants in Husbandry touching their Wages, though such Servants are hired for less Time than a Year. (Repealed by Poor Law Act 1927 (17 & 18 Geo. 5. c. 14))
Madder Act 1757 (repealed)	31 Geo. 2. c. 12	9 June 1758
An Act to encourage the Growth and Cultivation of Madder in that Part of Great Britain called England, by ascertaining the Tithe thereof there. (Repealed by Statute Law Revision Act 1867 (30 & 31 Vict. c. 59))
Allowing Time for First Meetings Act 1757 (repealed)	31 Geo. 2. c. 13	9 June 1758
An Act for allowing a further Time for holding the First Meetings of Commissioners or Trustees for putting in Execution certain Acts made in the last Session of Parliament. (Repealed by Statute Law Revision Act 1867 (30 & 31 Vict. c. 59))
Parliamentary Elections Act 1757 (repealed)	31 Geo. 2. c. 14	9 June 1758
An Act for explaining the Laws touching the Electors of Knights of the Shire to serve in Parliament for that Part of Great Britain called England. (Repealed by Statute Law Revision Act 1867 (30 & 31 Vict. c. 59))
Exportation (No. 3) Act 1757 (repealed)	31 Geo. 2. c. 15	9 June 1758
An Act for the Encouragement of the Exportation of Culm to Lisbon in the Kingdom of Portugal. (Repealed by Statute Law Revision Act 1867 (30 & 31 Vict. c. 59))
Crown Lands (Forfeited Estates) Act 1757 (repealed)	31 Geo. 2. c. 16	9 June 1758
An Act to enforce and render more effectual an Act made in the Twenty-fifth Year of His present Majesty's Reign, intituled, "An Act for annexing certain forfeited Estates in Scotland to the Crown unalienably, and for making Satisfaction to the lawful Creditors thereupon; and to establish a Method of managing the same, and applying the Rents and Profits thereof for the better civilizing and improving The Highlands of Scotland, and preventing Disorders there for the future." (Note: Crown Lands (Forfeited Estates) Act 1751 (25 Geo. 2. c. 41)) (Repealed by Statute Law (Repeals) Act 1978 (c. 45))
Westminster Act 1757 (repealed)	31 Geo. 2. c. 17	9 June 1758
An Act to explain, amend, and render more effectual, an Act passed in the Twenty-ninth Year of the Reign of His present Majesty, intituled, "An Act for appointing a sufficient Number of Constables for the Service of the City and Liberty of Westminster; and to compel proper Persons to take upon them the Office of Jurymen, to present Nuisances and other Offences within the said City and Liberty." (Note: Westminster Act 1756 (29 Geo. 2. c. 25)) (Repealed by Annoyance Jurors, Westminster Act 1861 (24 & 25 Vict. c. 78) and Court of Burgesses Scheme 1901 (SR&O 1901/811))
Bedford Level Drainage Act 1757	31 Geo. 2. c. 18	9 June 1758
An Act for draining and preserving certain Fen Lands and Low Grounds in the Isle of Ely and County of Cambridge, between The Cam otherwise Grant, Ouze, and Mildenhall Rivers, and bounded on the South East by the Hard Lands of Isleham, Fordham, Soham, and Wicken; and for empowering the Governor, Bailiffs, and Commonalty, of the Company of Conservators of the Great Level of the Fens, called Bedford Level, to sell certain Lands within the said Limits, commonly called Invested Lands.
Isle of Ely Drainage Act 1757 (repealed)	31 Geo. 2. c. 19	9 June 1758
An Act for draining and preserving certain Fen Lands, Low Grounds, and Commons, in the Parishes of Chatteris and Doddington, in the Isle of Ely, in the County of Cambridge. (Repealed by Fen Drainage Act 1775 (15 Geo. 3. c. 65))
London Bridge Act 1757	31 Geo. 2. c. 20	9 June 1758
An Act for applying a Sum of Money granted in this Session of Parliament, for re-building London Bridge; and for rendering more effectual an Act passed in the Twenty-ninth Year of His present Majesty's Reign, intituled, "An Act to improve, widen, and enlarge, the Passage over and through London Bridge." (Note: London Bridge Act 1756 (29 Geo. 2. c. 40))
Papists Act 1757 (repealed)	31 Geo. 2. c. 21	9 June 1758
An Act for allowing further Time for Enrolment of Deeds and Wills made by Papists; and for Relief of Protestant Purchasers. (Repealed by Statute Law Revision Act 1867 (30 & 31 Vict. c. 59))
Pension Duties Act 1757 (repealed)	31 Geo. 2. c. 22	9 June 1758
An Act for granting to His Majesty several Rates and Duties upon Offices and Pensions, and upon Houses, and upon Windows or Lights; and for raising the Sum of Five Millions, by Annuities and a Lottery, to be charged on the said Rates and Duties. (Repealed by Duties on Malt, etc. Act 1808 (48 Geo. 3. c. 2), Statute Law Revision Act 1870 (33 & 34 Vict. c. 69), Statute Law Revision Act 1887 (50 & 51 Vict. c. 59), Public Authorities Protection Act 1893 (56 & 57 Vict. c. 61) and Statute Law Revision Act 1948 (11 & 12 Geo. 6. c. 62))
Brixton Small Debts Act 1757 (repealed)	31 Geo. 2. c. 23	9 June 1758
An Act for the more easy and speedy Recovery of Small Debts within the Western Division of the Hundred of Brixton, in the County of Surrey. (Repealed by County Courts Act 1846 (9 & 10 Vict. c. 95))
Yarmouth Small Debts Act 1757 (repealed)	31 Geo. 2. c. 24	9 June 1758
An Act for the more easy and speedy Recovery of Small Debts within the Borough of Great Yarmouth and the Liberties thereof. (Repealed by County Courts Act 1846 (9 & 10 Vict. c. 95))
Westminster Corn and Grain Market Act 1757 (repealed)	31 Geo. 2. c. 25	9 June 1758
An Act for establishing a Free Market for the Sale of Corn and Grain, within the city or Liberty of Westminster. (Repealed by Statute Law (Repeals) Act 1978 (c. 45))
Militia (No. 2) Act 1757 (repealed)	31 Geo. 2. c. 26	20 June 1758
An Act to explain, amend, and enforce an Act, made in the last Session of Parliament, intituled, "An Act for the better Ordering of the Militia Forces, in the several Counties of that Part of Great Britain called England." (Note: Militia Act 1757 (30 Geo. 2. c. 25)) (Repealed by Statute Law Revision Act 1867 (30 & 31 Vict. c. 59))
Insurances on Foreign Ships Act 1757 (repealed)	31 Geo. 2. c. 27	20 June 1758
An Act for repealing an Act made in the Twenty-fifth Year of His present Majesty, (Note: Insurances on Foreign Ships Act 1751 (25 Geo. 2. c. 26)) to restrain the making Insurances on Foreign Ships bound to or from The East Indies. (Repealed by Statute Law Revision Act 1867 (30 & 31 Vict. c. 59))
Importation (No. 4) Act 1757 (repealed)	31 Geo. 2. c. 28	20 June 1758
An Act to permit the Importation of salted Beef, Pork, and Butter, from Ireland, for a limited Time. (Repealed by Statute Law Revision Act 1867 (30 & 31 Vict. c. 59))
Making of Bread Act 1757 (repealed)	31 Geo. 2. c. 29	20 June 1758
An Act for the due making of Bread; and to regulate the Price and Assize thereof; and to punish Persons who shall adulterate Meal, Flour, or Bread. (Repealed by Statute Law Revision Act 1867 (30 & 31 Vict. c. 59))
Militia Pay Act 1757 (repealed)	31 Geo. 2. c. 30	20 June 1758
An Act for applying the Money granted by Parliament towards defraying the Charge of Pay and Cloathing for the Militia, for the Year One Thousand Seven Hundred and Fifty-eight; and for defraying the Expenses incurred on account of the Militia in the Year One Thousand Seven Hundred and Fifty-seven. (Repealed by Statute Law Revision Act 1867 (30 & 31 Vict. c. 59))
Supply, etc. (No. 3) Act 1757 (repealed)	31 Geo. 2. c. 31	20 June 1758
An Act for granting to His Majesty certain Sums of Money out of the Sinking Fund, for the Service of the Year One Thousand Seven Hundred and Fifty-eight; and for empowering the proper Officers to make forth Duplicates of Exchequer Bills, Tickets, Certificates, Receipts, Annuity Orders, and other Orders, in lieu of such as shall be lost, burnt, or otherwise destroyed; and for obliging the Retailers of Wines, commonly called Sweets, or Made Wines, to take out a Wine License. (Repealed by Statute Law Revision Act 1867 (30 & 31 Vict. c. 59))
Plate (Duty on Dealer's Licence) Act 1757 (repealed)	31 Geo. 2. c. 32	20 June 1758
An Act for repealing the Duty granted by an Act made in the Sixth Year of the Reign of His late Majesty, (Note: Plate Duty Act 1719 (6 Geo. 1. c. 11)) on Silver Plate, made, wrought, touched, assayed, or marked, in Great Britain; and for granting a Duty on Licenses to be taken out by all Persons dealing in Gold or Silver Plate; and for discontinuing all Drawbacks upon Silver Plate exported; and for more effectually preventing Frauds and Abuses in the marking or stamping of Gold or Silver Plate. (Repealed by Customs and Inland Revenue Act 1890 (53 & 54 Vict. c. 8) (Note: Incorrectly cited as "Customs and Inland Revenue Act 1908" in the Chronological Table of the Statutes.))
Supply, etc. (No. 4) Act 1757 (repealed)	31 Geo. 2. c. 33	20 June 1758
An Act for enabling His Majesty to raise the Sum of Eight Hundred Thousand Pounds, for the Uses and Purposes therein mentioned; and for further appropriating the Supplies granted in this Session of Parliament. (Repealed by Statute Law Revision Act 1867 (30 & 31 Vict. c. 59))
Enlargement of Time for First Meetings Act 1757 (repealed)	31 Geo. 2. c. 34	20 June 1758
An Act for enlarging the Times for the First Meetings of Commissioners or Trustees for putting in Execution certain Acts of this Session of Parliament; and for other Purposes therein mentioned. (Repealed by Turnpike Roads Act 1766 (7 Geo. 3. c. 40))
Continuance of Laws, etc., (No. 2) Act 1757 (repealed)	31 Geo. 2. c. 35	20 June 1758
An Act to continue several Laws therein mentioned, for granting a Liberty to carry Sugars of the Growth, Produce, or Manufacture, of any of His Majesty's Sugar Colonies in America, from the said Colonies directly into Foreign Parts, in Ships built in Great Britain, and navigated according to Law; for the preventing the committing of Frauds by Bankrupts; for giving further Encouragement for the Importation of Naval Stores from the British Colonies in America; and for preventing Frauds and Abuses in the Admeasurement of Coals in the City and Liberty of Westminster; and for preventing the stealing or destroying of Madder Roots. (Repealed by Statute Law Revision Act 1867 (30 & 31 Vict. c. 59))
Passage from Charing Cross Act 1757 (repealed)	31 Geo. 2. c. 36	20 June 1758
An Act for continuing certain Laws therein mentioned, relating to British Sail Cloth, and to the Duties payable on Foreign Sail Cloth; and to the Allowance upon the Exportation of British made Gun-powder; and to the Encouragement of the Trade of the Sugar Colonies in America; and to the landing of Rum or Spirits of the British Sugar Plantations, before the Duties of Excise are paid thereon; and for regulating the Payment of the Duties on Foreign Exciseable Liquors; and for the Relief of Thomas Watson, with regard to the Drawback on certain East India Callicoes; and for rendering more commodious the new Passage leading from Charing Cross. (Repealed by Statute Law Revision Act 1867 (30 & 31 Vict. c. 59) and Statute Law (Repeals) Act 2013 (c. 2))
Exportation (No. 4) Act 1757 (repealed)	31 Geo. 2. c. 37	20 June 1758
An Act to permit the Exportation of certain Quantities of Malt now lying in His Majesty's Storehouses; and to allow the Bounty upon such Corn and Malt as was shipped and cleared for Ireland on or before a limited Time; and to authorize the Transportation of Flour, Meal, Bread, and Biscuit, to the Islands of Guernsey and Jeresey, for the Use of the Inhabitants there, in Lieu of the Wheat, Malt, or Barley, which may now by Law be transported to those Islands. (Repealed by Statute Law Revision Act 1867 (30 & 31 Vict. c. 59))
Fortifications Act 1757	31 Geo. 2. c. 38	20 June 1758
An Act for applying a Sum of Money granted in this Session of Parliament towards carrying on the Works for fortifying and securing the Harbour of Milford, in the County of Pembroke.
Fortifications (No. 2) Act 1757	31 Geo. 2. c. 39	20 June 1758
An Act for vesting certain Messuages, Lands, Tenements, and Hereditaments, for the better securing His Majesty's Docks, Ships, and Stores, at Portsmouth, Chatham, and Plymouth, and for the better fortifying the Town of Portsmouth and Citadel of Plymouth, in Trustees, for certain Uses; and for other Purposes therein mentioned.
Sale of Hay and Straw and of Cattle, London Act 1757 (repealed)	31 Geo. 2. c. 40	20 June 1758
An Act to ascertain the Weight of Trusses of Straw, and to punish Deceits in the Sale of Hay and Straw in Trusses, in London and within the Weekly Bills of Mortality, and within the Distance of Thirty Miles thereof; and to prevent common Salesmen of Hay and Straw from buying the same on their own Account, to sell again; and also to restrain Salesmen, Brokers, or Factors in Cattle, from buying on their own Account, to sell again, any live Cattle in London or within the Weekly Bills of Mortality, or which are driving up thereto. (Repealed by Hay and Straw Act 1796 (36 Geo. 3. c. 88) and Statute Law Revision Act 1948 (11 & 12 Geo. 6. c. 62))
Inclosure Act 1757 (repealed)	31 Geo. 2. c. 41	20 June 1758
An Act to amend and render more effectual an Act passed in the Twenty-ninth Year of His present Majesty's Reign, intituled, "An Act for enclosing, by the mutual Consent of the Lords and Tenants, Part of any Common, for the Purpose of planting and preserving Trees fit for Timber or Underwood; and for more effectually preventing the unlawful Destruction of Trees." (Note: Inclosure Act 1756 (29 Geo. 2. c. 36)) (Repealed by Commons Act 1899 (62 & 63 Vict. c. 30))
Continuance, etc., of Acts, 1757 (repealed)	31 Geo. 2. c. 42	20 June 1758
An Act for making perpetual several Acts therein mentioned, for preventing Theft and Rapine on the Northern Borders of England; for the more effectual punishing wicked and evil-disposed Persons going armed in Disguise, and doing Injuries and Violences to the Persons and Properties of His Majesty's Subjects, and for the more speedy bringing the Offenders to Justice; and also Two Clauses, to prevent the cutting or breaking down the Bank of any River or Sea Bank, and to prevent the malicious cutting of Hop-binds; for the more effectual Punishment of Persons maliciously setting on Fire any Mine, Pit, or Delph of Coal or Canal Coal; and of Persons unlawfully hunting or taking any Red or Fallow Deer, in Forests or Chases; or beating or wounding the Keepers or other Officers in Forests, Chases, or Parks; and also so much of an Act as relates to the Power of appealing to the Circuit Courts in Civil Cases in Scotland. (Repealed by Statute Law Revision Act 1867 (30 & 31 Vict. c. 59))
Dorset and Devon Roads Act 1757 (repealed)	31 Geo. 2. c. 43	23 March 1758
An Act for repairing and widening several Roads, in the Counties of Dorset and Devon, leading to and through the Borough of Lyme Regis. (Repealed by Lyme Regis Roads Act 1821 (1 & 2 Geo. 4. c. cviii))
Monmouth and Gloucester Roads Act 1757 (repealed)	31 Geo. 2. c. 44	23 March 1758
An Act for repairing the Road from the Village of Magor to the Bridge Foot in the Town of Chepstow in the County of Monmouth, and other Roads in the Counties of Monmouth and Gloucester. (Repealed by Magor and Chepstow Road Act 1800 (39 & 40 Geo. 3. c. xv))
Bermondsey (Poor Relief) Act 1757 (repealed)	31 Geo. 2. c. 45	23 March 1758
An Act for ascertaining and collecting the Poors Rates, and for better regulating the Poor, in the Parish of Saint Mary Magdalen, Bermondsey, in the County of Surrey. (Repealed by St. Mary Magdalen Bermondsey Poor Relief and Churchyard Act 1809 (49 Geo. 3. c. clxxxiv) and London Government (Borough of Bermondsey) Order in Council 1901 (SR&O 1901/264))
Old Brentford Bridge (No. 2) Act 1757 (repealed)	31 Geo. 2. c. 46	23 March 1758
An Act to amend an Act passed in the last Session of Parliament, intituled, "An Act for building a Bridge, or Bridges, cross the River of Thames, from a certain Place in Old Brentford, in the Parish of Ealing, in the County of Middlesex, known by the Name of Smith or Smith's Hill, to the opposite Shore in the County of Surry." (Note: Old Brentford Bridge Act 1757 (30 Geo. 2. c. 46)) (Repealed by Statute Law Revision Act 1950 (14 Geo. 6. c. 6))
Devon Bridges Act 1757	31 Geo. 2. c. 47	23 March 1758
An Act for the more easy and speedy repairing of publick Bridges, within the County of Devon.
New Woodstock, Kiddington, etc. Roads Act 1757 (repealed)	31 Geo. 2. c. 48	23 March 1758
An Act for enlarging the Term and Powers granted by an Act of Parliament, passed in the Twenty-fourth Year of His present Majesty's Reign, (Note: Oxford Roads Act 1750 (24 Geo. 2. c. 21)) for enlarging the Term and Powers granted by an Act passed in the Third Year of the Reign of His present Majesty, (Note: Oxfordshire Roads Act 1729 (3 Geo. 2. c. 21)) for repairing and amending the several Roads leading from Woodstock, through Kiddington and Enstone, to Rollright Lane, and Enslow Bridge to Kiddington aforesaid; and for making the said Act more effectual. (Repealed by Woodstock and Rollright Lane Roads Act 1804 (44 Geo. 3. c. lxxix) and Woodstock and Rollright Lane Roads (Oxfordshire) Act 1825 (6 Geo. 4. c. xciv))
Tiverton Roads Act 1757 (repealed)	31 Geo. 2. c. 49	23 March 1758
An Act for amending several Roads leading from the Town of Tiverton, in the County of Devon. (Repealed by Tiverton Roads Act 1811 (51 Geo. 3. c. xlviii))
Lincoln Roads Act 1757 (repealed)	31 Geo. 2. c. 50	23 March 1758
An Act for repairing and widening the Roads from Donington High Bridge to Hale Drove, and to the Eighth Mile Stone in the Parish of Wigtoft, and to Langret Ferry, in the County of Lincoln. (Repealed by Roads from Donington High Bridge Act 1822 (3 Geo. 4. c. ix))
Devon Roads Act 1757 (repealed)	31 Geo. 2. c. 51	23 March 1758
An Act for repairing the High Road leading from Brent Bridge, in the County of Devon, to Gasking Gate, in or near the Borough of Plymouth, in the said County. (Repealed by Brent Bridge and Plymouth (Gasking Street) Road Act 1841 (4 & 5 Vict. c. xxxii))
Prestonpans Beer Duties Act 1757 (repealed)	31 Geo. 2. c. 52	13 April 1758
An Act for enlarging the Term granted by an Act made in the Twenty-sixth Year of His present Majesty's Reign, intituled, "An Act for laying a Duty of Two Pennies Scots, or a Sixth Part of a Penny Sterling, upon every Scots Pint of Ale and Beer, which shall be brewed for Sale, brought into, tapped, or sold, within the Town and Parish of Preston Pans, in the Shire of East Lothian, otherwise Haddingtoun, for repairing the Harbour of the said Town; and for other Purposes therein mentioned." (Note: Prestonpans Beer Duties Act 1753 (26 Geo. 2. c. 79)) (Repealed by Statute Law Revision Act 1948 (11 & 12 Geo. 6. c. 62))
Exeter (Poor Relief) Act 1757 (repealed)	31 Geo. 2. c. 53	13 April 1758
An Act to explain, amend, and render more effectual, an Act passed in the Ninth and Tenth Years of the Reign of His late Majesty King William the Third, intituled, "An Act for erecting Hospitals and Workhouses within the City and County of the City of Exon, for the better employing and maintaining the Poor there." (Note: Exeter Workhouse Act 1697 (9 Will. 3. c. 3 Pr.)) (Repealed by Local Government Board's Provisional Order Confirmation (No. 11) Act 1913 (3 & 4 Geo. 5. c. cxxxv))
Gloucestershire Roads Act 1757 (repealed)	31 Geo. 2. c. 54	13 April 1758
An Act for repealing so much of the Act of the Fifteenth Year of His present Majesty, (Note: Gloucestershire Roads Act 1741 (15 Geo. 2. c. 15)) for enlarging the Term and Powers granted by an Act of the Thirteenth Year of His late Majesty King George the First, (Note: Cirencester Roads Act 1726 (13 Geo. 1. c. 11)) for repairing the Roads from Cirencester Town's End to Saint John's Bridge in the County of Gloucester, as directs that the Inhabitants of the several Parishes and Hamlets therein named shall pass Tollfree; and for repairing the Street from The High Cross in Cirencester to the Town's End there; and for other Purposes therein mentioned; and for enlarging the Terms and Powers granted by the said Two former Acts. (Repealed by Cirencester Roads Act 1825 (6 Geo. 4. c. cxliii))
Edinburgh and Glasgow Roads Act 1757 (repealed)	31 Geo. 2. c. 55	13 April 1758
An Act for enlarging the Term and Powers granted by an Act of the Twenty-fifth Year of His present Majesty's Reign, intituled, "An Act for repairing the Post Road from the City of Edinburgh, through the Counties of Linlithgow and Stirling, from The Boathouse Ford on Almond Water, and from thence to the Town of Linlithgow, and from the said Town to Falkirk, and from thence to Stirling; and also from Falkirk to Kilsyth, and to Inch Bellie Bridge in the Post Road to the City of Glasgow;" (Note: Post Roads in Scotland Act 1751 (25 Geo. 2. c. 28)) and for building a Bridge cross Almond Water. (Repealed by Linlithgow Roads Act 1790 (30 Geo. 3. c. 105))
Bristol (Poor Relief) Act 1757 (repealed)	31 Geo. 2. c. 56	9 June 1758
An Act for enlarging the Powers granted by an Act passed in the Eighteenth Year of the Reign of His present Majesty, intituled, "An Act for rendering more effectual the several Acts passed for the erecting of Hospitals and Workhouses within the City of Bristol, for the better employing and maintaining of the Poor thereof;" (Note: Bristol Hospitals Act 1744 (18 Geo. 2. c. 38)) and for making the said Act more effectual. (Repealed by Bristol Improvement Act 1822 (3 Geo. 4. c. xxiv))
Old Stratford to Dunchurch Road Act 1757 (repealed)	31 Geo. 2. c. 57	9 June 1758
An Act for making more effectual Four several Acts of Parliament, made in the Sixth Year of the Reign of Her late Majesty Queen Anne, (Note: Old Stratford to Dunchurch Road Act 1707 (6 Ann. c. 77)) the Eleventh Year of the Reign of His late Majesty King George the First, (Note: Old Stratford to Dunchurch Road Act 1724 (11 Geo. 1. c. 25)) and in the Tenth (Note: Old Stratford to Dunchurch Road Act 1736 (10 Geo. 2. c. 11)) and Thirteenth (Note: Old Stratford to Dunchurch Road Act 1739 (13 Geo. 2. c. 5)) Years of the Reign of His present Majesty, respectively, for repairing the Highways from Old Stratford in the County of Northampton, to Dunchurch in the County of Warwick. (Repealed by Old Stratford to Dunchurch Road Act 1775 (15 Geo. 3. c. 73))
Birmingham to Edgehill Road Act 1757 (repealed)	31 Geo. 2. c. 58	9 June 1758
An Act to continue and render more effectual Two Acts of Parliament, made in the Twelfth Year of the Reign of His late Majesty, (Note: Birmingham to Edgehill Road Act 1725 (12 Geo. 1. c. 6)) and in the Eighteenth Year of the Reign of His present Majesty, (Note: Birmingham to Edgehill Road Act 1744 (18 Geo. 2. c. 32)) for repairing the Roads leading from Birmingham to Edghill, in the County of Warwick. (Repealed by Birmingham and Stratford-upon-Avon Road Act 1821 (1 & 2 Geo. 4. c. lxxxi) (Note: Incorrectly cited as "1 & 2 Geo. 4. c. lxxi" in the Chronological Table of the Statutes.) and Birmingham and Edgehill Road Act 1830 (11 Geo. 4 & 1 Will. 4. c. xciv))
Wilden Ferry Bridge Act 1757 or the Cavendish Bridge Act 1757 (repealed)	31 Geo. 2. c. 59	9 June 1758
An Act for building a Bridge cross the River Trent, at or near a Place called Wilden Ferry. (Repealed by Cavendish, Harrington and Willington Bridges (Transfer) Act 1896 (59 & 60 Vict. c. xix))
Derby and Notts Roads Act 1757	31 Geo. 2. c. 60	9 June 1758
An Act to enlarge, alter, and render more effectual, the Term and Powers of an Act of the Twelfth Year of His present Majesty, (Note: Derbyshire Roads Act 1738 (12 Geo. 2. c. 12)) for repairing the Roads from Bakewell to Chesterfield in the County of Derby, and from Chesterfield to Worksop in the County of Nottingham, and other Roads therein mentioned.
Cirencester to Cricklade Road Act 1757 (repealed)	31 Geo. 2. c. 61	9 June 1758
An Act for repairing and widening the Road from Cirencester in the County of Gloucester, to Cricklade in the County of Wilts. (Repealed by Road from Cirencester to Cricklade Act 1822 (3 Geo. 4. c. ci) and Cirencester Roads Act 1825 (6 Geo. 4. c. cxliii))
Yorks and Derby Roads Act 1757 (repealed)	31 Geo. 2. c. 62	9 June 1758
An Act for repairing and widening the Roads from Little Sheffield in the County of York, through the Towns of Hathersage, Hope, and Castleton, to Sparrowpit Gate in the County of Derby, and from the Guide Post near Barber's Fields Cupola, through Grindleford Bridge, Great Hucklow, Tidswell, Hardgate Wall, and Fairfield, to Buxton in the County of Derby. (Repealed by Yorkshire and Derby Roads Act 1795 (35 Geo. 3. c. 164) and Sheffield and Chapel-en-le-Frith Roads Act 1825 (6 Geo. 4. c. cxliv))
Leeds and Wakefield Road Act 1757 (repealed)	31 Geo. 2. c. 63	9 June 1758
An Act for repairing the Road from Leeds to Sheffield, in the County of York. (Repealed by Road from Leeds to Wakefield Act 1821 (1 & 2 Geo. 4. c. v) and Wakefield and Sheffield Road Act 1830 (11 Geo. 4 & 1 Will. 4. c. xxii))
Gloucestershire Roads (No. 2) Act 1757 (repealed)	31 Geo. 2. c. 64	9 June 1758
An Act for enlarging the Terms and Powers of Two Acts of Parliament, one passed in the Nineteenth Year of the Reign of His present Majesty, (Note: Gloucester Roads Act 1745 (19 Geo. 2. c. 18)) intituled, "An Act for enlarging the Term and Powers granted by an Act passed in the Twelfth Year of the Reign of His late Majesty King George the First, (Note: Gloucestershire Roads Act 1725 (12 Geo. 1. c. 24)) for repairing the Road from the City of Gloucester to Stone, and other Roads therein mentioned; and for making the said Act more effectual;" and the other passed in the Twenty-second Year of the Reign of His present Majesty, (Note: Bristol Roads Act 1748 (22 Geo. 2. c. 28)) intituled, "An Act for continuing Two Acts of Parliament, the one passed in the Thirteenth Year of the Reign of His late Majesty King George the First, (Note: Bristol Roads Act 1726 (13 Geo. 1. c. 12)) for amending the several Roads leading from the City of Bristol, and the other passed in the Fourth Year of the Reign of His present Majesty, (Note: Bristol Roads Act 1730 (4 Geo. 2. c. 22)) to explain and amend the same Act; and for making the same Acts more effectual; and also for repairing other Roads therein mentioned;" and for making all the said Acts more effectual; and for repairing, widening, and keeping in Repair, several other Roads. (Repealed by Statute Law (Repeals) Act 2013 (c. 2))
Gloucestershire Roads (No. 3) Act 1757 (repealed)	31 Geo. 2. c. 65	9 June 1758
An Act for repairing and widening the Roads from Tetbury to the Gates on the West of Simond's Hall Down, and from the Turnpike Gate at the Top of Frocester Hill to the Turnpike Road from Cirencester towards Bath, and from the Field called Bouldoun Sleight to the End of a Lane adjoining to a Road from Horsley to Tetbury near Tiltup's Inn, and from the Market House in Tetbury to the Turnpike Road on Minchin Hampton Common, and from the said Road in Minchin Hampton Field unto the Turnpike Road from Cirencester to Stroud near Burnt Ash, and from the said Turnpike Road to Tayloe's Mill Pond in Chalford Bottom, and through Hide to the Bottom of The Bourne Hill, in the County of Gloucester. (Repealed by Roads from Tetbury, Frocester Hill and from Latterwood Act 1821 (1 & 2 Geo. 4. c. lxxxiii) and Statute Law (Repeals) Act 2013 (c. 2))
Wilts and Berks Roads Act 1757	31 Geo. 2. c. 66	9 June 1758
An Act for amending, widening, and keeping in Repair, the Roads leading from Christian Malford Bridge in the County of Wilts, to Shillingford Gate in the County of Berks, and also from Swindon to Lyddenton Wall in the said County of Wilts.
Shrewsbury, etc. Roads Act 1757 (repealed)	31 Geo. 2. c. 67	9 June 1758
An Act for widening and repairing several Roads leading from The Welch Gate and Cotton Hill in the Town of Shrewsbury, in the County of Salop. (Repealed by Roads from Shrewsbury and from Shelton Act 1822 (3 Geo. 4. c. xlii))
Wilts Roads Act 1757	31 Geo. 2. c. 68	9 June 1758
An Act for amending the Road leading from Pengate in the Parish of Westbury in the County of Wilts, to Latchet's Bridge near the East End of Market Lavington, and also the Road leading from Market Lavington Down to the Turnpike Road near Dewey's Water, and also the Road leading from Bolesborough to Studley Lane End, and also the Road leading from Yarnbrook to the Turnpike Road at Melksham in the said County of Wilts.
Kirkcaldy Beer Duties Act 1757 (repealed)	31 Geo. 2. c. 69	9 June 1758
An Act to continue and render more effectual an Act made in the Fifteenth Year of His present Majesty's Reign, intituled, "An Act for laying a Duty of Two Pennies Scots, or One Sixth Part of a Penny Sterling, upon every Scots Pint of Ale and Beer, which shall be brewed for Sale, brought into, tapped, or sold, within the Town of Kirkcaldy, and Liberties thereof." (Note: Kirkcaldy Beer Duties Act 1741 (15 Geo. 2. c. 8)) (Repealed by Statute Law Revision Act 1948 (11 & 12 Geo. 6. c. 62))
Gloucestershire Roads (No. 4) Act 1757 (repealed)	31 Geo. 2. c. 70	9 June 1758
An Act to enable the Trustees appointed for putting in Execution an Act passed in this Session of Parliament, intituled, "An Act for repealing so much of the Act of the Fifteenth Year of His present Majesty, for enlarging the Term and Powers granted by an Act of the Thirteenth Year of His late Majesty King George the First, for repairing the Roads from Cirencester Town's End to Saint John's Bridge, in the County of Gloucester, as directs that the Inhabitants of the several Parishes and Hamlets therein named shall pass Toll-free; and for repairing the Street from The High Cross in Cirencester to the Town's End there; and for other Purposes therein mentioned; and for enlarging the Terms and Powers granted by the said Two former Acts," (Note: Gloucestershire Roads Act 1757 (31 Geo. 2. c. 54)) to reduce all or any of the Tolls granted by the said Act; and for appointing additional Trustees for putting the said Acts in Execution. (Repealed by Cirencester Roads Act 1825 (6 Geo. 4. c. cxliii))
Colne Oyster Fishery Act 1757 (repealed)	31 Geo. 2. c. 71	9 June 1758
An Act for regulating, governing, preserving, and improving, the Oyster Fishery in the River Colne, and Waters thereto belonging. (Repealed by Colne Fishery Act 1870 (33 & 34 Vict. c. lxxxv))
Calder and Hebble Navigation Act 1757 (repealed)	31 Geo. 2. c. 72	9 June 1758
An Act for extending the Navigation of the River Calder to or near to Sowerby Bridge, in the Parish of Halifax; and for making navigable the River Hebble, Halig, or Halifax Brook, from Brooksmouth to Salter Hebble Bridge, in the County of York. (Repealed by Calder and Hebble Navigation Act 1769 (9 Geo. 3. c. 71))
Hampshire Roads Act 1757 (repealed)	31 Geo. 2. c. 73	9 June 1758
An Act for repairing and widening the Roads from Chawton Pond in the Parish of Chawton in the County of Southampton, through Rumsdean Bottom, Westmeon, Warnford, Exton, Bishop's Waltham, and over Sherrill Heath, and through Wickham and Fareham, to the Town of Gosport, and from Exton aforesaid, through Droxford, to the East End of Sherrill Heath in the said County. (Repealed by Southampton Roads Act 1780 (20 Geo. 3. c. 77) (Note: Incorrectly cited as "20 Geo. 3. c. 71" in the Chronological Table of the Statutes.))
Hampshire Roads (No. 2) Act 1757	31 Geo. 2. c. 74	9 June 1758
An Act for repairing and widening the Roads from the Town of Bishop's Waltham in the County of Southampton, over the Top of the Down called Stephen's Castle Down, and through Salt Lane and Titchborne, to the Town of New Alresford; and from the Market House in the said Town of New Alresford, through Old Alresford, Bradley Lane, and over Herriard Common, to the Town of Odiham in the said County.
Stockbridge and Winchester Roads Act 1757 (repealed)	31 Geo. 2. c. 75	9 June 1758
An Act for repairing and widening the Roads from the Town of Stockbridge in the County of Southampton, to the City of Winchester; and from the said City, through Bellmour Lane, to the Top of Steven's Castle Down near the Town of Bishop's Waltham in the said County; and from the said City of Winchester, through Otterborne, to Bar Gate in the Town and County of the Town of Southampton. (Repealed by Stockbridge, Winchester and Southampton Roads Act 1823 (4 Geo. 4. c. xv))
Thames Coalheavers Act 1757 (repealed)	31 Geo. 2. c. 76	20 June 1758
An Act for Relief of the Coalheavers working upon the River Thames; and for enabling them to make a Provision for such of themselves as shall be sick, lame, or past their Labour, and for their Widows and Orphans. (Repealed by Thames Coalheavers Act 1770 (10 Geo. 3. c. 53))
Leatherhead and Guildford Road Act 1757 (repealed)	31 Geo. 2. c. 77	20 June 1758
An Act for repairing and widening the Road from The Swan Inn at Leatherhead to the May-pole at the Upper End of Spital or Somerset Street, in the Parish of Stoake near the Town of Guldeford, in the County of Surrey. (Repealed by Road from Leatherhead to Stoke (Surrey) Act 1822 (3 Geo. 4. c. xcvii), Annual Turnpike Acts Continuance Act 1867 (30 & 31 Vict. c. 121) and Statute Law (Repeals) Act 2013 (c. 2))
Guildford to Farnham Road Act 1757 (repealed)	31 Geo. 2. c. 78	20 June 1758
An Act for repairing and widening the Road from the Town of Guldeford to the Directing Post near the Town of Farnham, in the County of Surrey. (Repealed by Guildford to Farnham Road Act 1822 (3 Geo. 4. c. lxvii), Annual Turnpike Acts Continuance Act 1876 (39 & 40 Vict. c. 39) and Statute Law (Repeals) Act 2013 (c. 2))

=== Private acts ===
Short title	Citation	Royal assent
Long title
John Earl of Sandwich, Wellbore Ellis and Thomas Potter: oaths of office.	31 Geo. 2. c. 1 Pr.	23 December 1757
An Act to enable John Earl of Sandwich, Wellbore Ellis Esquire, and Thomas Potter Esquire, to take, in Great Britain, the Oath of Office as Vice Treasurer and Receiver General and Paymaster General of all His Majesty's Revenues in the Kingdom of Ireland; and to qualify themselves for the Enjoyment of the said Offices.
Transfer of South Sea Annuities, standing in the name of the late treasurer for the commissioners for building 50 new churches, to the rectors of 8 of those churches and for vesting in trustees for sale the sites of certain churches purchased by said commissioners.	31 Geo. 2. c. 2 Pr.	23 March 1758
An Act for transferring certain South Sea Annuities, standing in the Name of the late Treasurer to the Commissioners for building Fifty new Churches, unto the respective Rectors of Eight of those Churches; and for vesting certain Scites for Churches, purchased by the said Commissioners, in Trustees, in order to sell the same, for the Purposes therein mentioned.
Enabling George Amyand and John Anthony Rucker, agents of Embden East India Company, to sell and dispose of the cargo of the ship "Prince Ferdinand of Prussia", to the United Company of Merchants of England and enable them to purchase, land, sell or dispose of any part thereof and to empower the said Amyand and Rucker to make insurances upon the ship and its cargo.	31 Geo. 2. c. 3 Pr.	23 March 1758
An Act to enable George Amyand and John Anthony Rucker of London Merchants, Agents for the Embden East India Company, to sell and dispose of the Cargo of the Ship The Prince Ferdinand of Prussia, to the United Company of Merchants of England trading to The East Indies; and to enable the said United Company to purchase, lend, sell, and dispose of, the same, or any Part thereof; and to empower the said George Amyand and John Anthony Rucker to make Insurances upon the said Ship and Cargo.
Woollett's Estate Act 1757	31 Geo. 2. c. 4 Pr.	23 March 1758
An Act to enable Mary Woollett Spinster (notwithstanding her Infancy), upon her Marriage with Robert Mead Wilmot Esquire, to settle and convey her Estate and Interest in certain Messuages, Lands, and Hereditaments, in the County of Kent, and in Two several Sums of Two Thousand Pounds and Three Hundred Pounds, to the Uses in certain Articles of Agreement mentioned.
Wentworth's Divorce Act 1757	31 Geo. 2. c. 5 Pr.	23 March 1758
An Act to dissolve the Marriage of Godfrey Wentworth Esquire with Dorothea Pilkington his now Wife; and to enable him to marry again; and for other Purposes therein mentioned.
Brancepeth Inclosure Act 1757	31 Geo. 2. c. 6 Pr.	23 March 1758
An Act for dividing and enclosing certain Wastes, or Commons, called Brancepeth and Stockley Moors, or Commons, within the Manor and Parish of Brancepeth, in the County of Durham.
Great Glen Inclosure Act 1757	31 Geo. 2. c. 7 Pr.	23 March 1758
An Act for dividing and enclosing certain Open and Common Fields, in Great Glen, in the County of Leicester, called The Upper or North End Fields, and all the Common Pastures, Common Meadows, and Common and Waste Grounds, within the same Fields.
Clifford's Naturalization Act 1757	31 Geo. 2. c. 8 Pr.	23 March 1758
An Act for naturalizing George Clifford.
Vesting forests and manors in Singleton and Charlton and other manors and lands in Sussex and Wiltshire, in trustees, upon trusts therein mentioned, freed from estates, uses and trusts to which they are at present subject.	31 Geo. 2. c. 9 Pr.	13 April 1758
An Act for vesting the Forests and Manors of Singleton and Charlton, and other Manors, Lands, Tenements, and Hereditaments, in the Counties of Sussex and Wilts, in Trustees and their Heirs, upon the Trusts therein mentioned, freed and discharged from the Estates, Uses, and Trusts, to which the same are at present subject; and for other Purposes therein mentioned.
Hamsterley Inclosure Act 1757	31 Geo. 2. c. 10 Pr.	13 April 1758
An Act for enclosing and dividing the Moors and Commons within the Chapelry of Hamsterly, in the Manor of Wolsingham, in the County of Durham.
Confirmation of a lease of mines contract between Duke of Queensberry and Dover, Ronald and James Crawfurd and Daniel Telfer.	31 Geo. 2. c. 11 Pr.	9 June 1758
An Act for confirming a Contract of Lease of Mines, between Charles Duke of Queensberry and Dover of the one Part, and Ronald Crawfurd, James Crawfurd, and Daniel Telfer of the other Part; and for enabling the said Duke and his Heirs of Entail to grant Leases in Terms of the said Contract.
Earl of Egmont's Estate Act 1757	31 Geo. 2. c. 12 Pr.	9 June 1758
An Act to enable John Earl of Egmont in the Kingdom of Ireland to raise Money, for purchasing Lands in Great Britain, for the Purposes of his Marriage Settlement, by Mortgage instead of Sale, of Part of his Irish Estate.
Ralph Earl and Dame Henrietta Maria of Verney and Clayton's estate: sale of lands in London and purchase and settling of others with proceeds.	31 Geo. 2. c. 13 Pr.	9 June 1758
An Act for selling divers Lands and Tenements, and Shares of Lands and Tenements, in London, Middlesex, and Surrey, of and belonging to Ralph Earl of Verney in the Kingdom of Ireland, Mary Countess of Verney, and Dame Henrietta Maria Clayton, respectively; and for laying out the Money arising by such Sale in purchasing other Lands and Hereditaments, to be settled in Lieu thereof.
Earl of Kerry and Lixnaw's Estate Act 1757	31 Geo. 2. c. 14 Pr.	9 June 1758
An Act to enable Sir Maurice Crosbie Knight, or any future Guardian of Francis Thomas Earl of Kerry and Lixnaw in the Kingdom of Ireland, a Minor, to discharge Encumbrances on certain Collieries and Coal Mines in the County of Durham, Part of the Estate of the said Earl.
Lord Bulkeley's Estate Act 1757	31 Geo. 2. c. 15 Pr.	9 June 1758
An Act for carrying into Execution several Contracts, made by or on Behalf of James late Lord Bulkeley in the Kingdom of Ireland, in his Life-time, for the Sale of several Lands and Tenements in the County of Anglesey; and for applying the Purchase money to discharge Encumbrances affecting the same.
Sir William Turner's Charities Act 1757	31 Geo. 2. c. 16 Pr.	9 June 1758
An Act for settling the several Charities of the Hospital and Free School at Kirkleatham in the County of York, of the Foundation of Sir William Turner Knight, deceased, and the Possessions and Revenues thereunto belonging, pursuant to the Will and Codicil of Cholmley Turner, late of Kirkleatham aforesaid, Esquire, deceased.
Bagot's Name Act 1757	31 Geo. 2. c. 17 Pr.	9 June 1758
An Act to enable Charles Bagot, now called Charles Chester, and his Sons, to take the Surname of Chester; and for carrying an Agreement therein mentioned into Execution.
Read's Estate Act 1757	31 Geo. 2. c. 18 Pr.	9 June 1758
An Act for vesting in William Read Esquire and his Heirs several entailed Estates in the County of York, in order that the same may be sold; and for the settling another Estate, in the said County of York, to the like Uses.
Norris' Estate Act 1757	31 Geo. 2. c. 19 Pr.	9 June 1758
An Act for vesting Part of the Lands, Tenements, and Hereditaments, settled on the Marriage of William Norris Esquire, in the said William Norris and his Heirs; and for settling other Lands in Lieu thereof.
Powney's Estate Act 1757	31 Geo. 2. c. 20 Pr.	9 June 1758
An Act to vest Part of the settled Estate of Penyston Powney Esquire, deceased, in Trustees, to be sold; and to lay out the Money arising from the Sale thereof in Real Estates, to be settled to the same Uses.
Tuffnell's Divorce Act 1757	31 Geo. 2. c. 21 Pr.	9 June 1758
An Act to dissolve the Marriage of George Forster Tufnell Esquire with Elizabeth Forster his now Wife; and to enable him to marry again; and for other Purposes therein mentioned.
Middleton Railway Act 1757 (repealed)	31 Geo. 2. c. 22 Pr.	9 June 1758
An Act for establishing Agreements made between Charles Brandling Esquire and other Persons, Proprietors of Lands, for laying down a Waggonway, in order for the better supplying the Town and Neighbourhood of Leeds, in the County of York, with Coals. (Repealed by Statute Law (Repeals) Act 1978 (c. 45))
Ottringham Inclosure Act 1757	31 Geo. 2. c. 23 Pr.	9 June 1758
An Act to confirm and establish Articles of Agreement, for dividing and enclosing several Open and Common Fields in Ottringham, in the County of York.
Brompton and Sawdon Inclosure Act 1757	31 Geo. 2. c. 24 Pr.	9 June 1758
An Act for confirming and establishing Articles of Agreement, for dividing and enclosing the Open Common Fields, Common Meadows, Commons, and Waste Grounds, in the Townships of Brompton and Sawden, in the Parish of Brompton, in the North Riding of the County of York.
Settle Inclosure Act 1757	31 Geo. 2. c. 25 Pr.	9 June 1758
An Act for establishing and confirming Articles of Agreement, for dividing and enclosing Two Stinted Pastures or Commons, called Settle Banks High Scarr, and Scaleber, within the Township of Settle, in the County of York.
Newton cum Benningbrough Inclosure Act 1757	31 Geo. 2. c. 26 Pr.	9 June 1758
An Act for dividing and enclosing Newton Moor, or Newton Common, within the Manor of Newton cum Benningbrough, in the County of York.
Geydon in Bishop's Itchington (Warwickshire) inclosure.	31 Geo. 2. c. 27 Pr.	9 June 1758
An Act for dividing and enclosing the Common and Open Fields, Common Pastures, Common Meadows, Common Pieces, Common Grounds, and Waste Grounds, in the Township of Geydon, in the Parish of Bishop's Itchington, in the County of Warwick.
Skirpenbeck Inclosure Act 1757	31 Geo. 2. c. 28 Pr.	9 June 1758
An Act for dividing and allotting certain Fields, Meadow Grounds, and Common Pastures, in the Manor and Township of Skirpenbeck, in the County of York; and for other Purposes therein mentioned.
Northleigh Inclosure Act 1757	31 Geo. 2. c. 29 Pr.	9 June 1758
An Act for dividing and enclosing certain Open and Common Fields, and a Common or Waste called Northleigh Heath, within the Parish or Township of Northleigh, in the County of Oxford.
Upper and Lower Boddington (Northamptonshire) inclosures and settling an annual sum to be paid in lieu of certain tithes.	31 Geo. 2. c. 30 Pr.	9 June 1758
An Act for dividing and enclosing the Common Fields, Common Pastures, Common Meadows, Common Grounds, Heaths, and Waste Ground, of Upper Boddington and Lower Boddington, within the Parish of Upper Boddington, in the County of Northampton; and for settling a Rate, or certain annual Sum of Money, to be paid in Lieu of the Tithes of certain old Enclosures within the said Parish.
Woodford or Halse Woodford (Northamptonshire) Inclosure Act 1757	31 Geo. 2. c. 31 Pr.	9 June 1758
An Act for dividing and enclosing the Common Fields, Common Pastures, Common Meadows, Common Grounds, and Waste Grounds, in the Manor and Lordship of Woodford, otherwise Halse Woodford, in the County of Northampton.
Hareby Inclosure Act 1757	31 Geo. 2. c. 32 Pr.	9 June 1758
An Act for dividing and enclosing the Common, Open, and Arable Fields, and Common Meadows, in the Manor and Parish of Hareby, in the County of Lincoln.
Helmdon Inclosure Act 1757	31 Geo. 2. c. 33 Pr.	9 June 1758
An Act for dividing and enclosing the Open and Common Fields, Common Meadows, Common Ground, and Waste Ground, in the Manor and Parish of Helmdon, in the County of Northampton.
Wilnecote Inclosure Act 1757	31 Geo. 2. c. 34 Pr.	9 June 1758
An Act for confirming and establishing Articles of Agreement, for dividing and enclosing certain Common Fields within the Manor of Wilnecote, in the County of Warwick; and also for erecting and working one or more Fire Engine or Fire Engines, for the more effectual draining the Coal Mines in the said Manor.
Upton Inclosure Act 1757	31 Geo. 2. c. 35 Pr.	9 June 1758
An Act for dividing and enclosing certain Open and Common Fields in the Hamlet, Township, or Village of Upton, in the Parish of Blewbury, in the County of Berks.
Edith Weston Inclosure Act 1757	31 Geo. 2. c. 36 Pr.	9 June 1758
An Act for confirming and establishing certain Articles of Agreement, for dividing and enclosing the Open Common Fields in the Parish of Edithweston, in the County of Rutland.
Naturalization of Anthony Fonblanque and Nicholas Baptist Aubert.	31 Geo. 2. c. 37 Pr.	9 June 1758
An Act for naturalizing Anthony Fonblanque and Nicholas Baptist Aubert.
Baptist D'Abbadie's Naturalization Act 1757	31 Geo. 2. c. 38 Pr.	9 June 1758
An Act for naturalizing John Baptist D'Abbadie.
Earl Ferrers' Divorce Act 1757	31 Geo. 2. c. 39 Pr.	20 June 1758
An Act for separating Lawrence Earl Ferrers from Mary Countess Ferrers his Wife, for the Cruelty of the said Earl; and for settling a Maintenance for the said Countess, out of the Estate of the said Earl.
Enabling dean and chapter of St Peter's church, Westminster, to grant leases to James Mallors of grounds comprised within certain limits, for a longer term of years than is possible at present.	31 Geo. 2. c. 40 Pr.	20 June 1758
An Act to enable the Dean and Chapter of the Collegiate Church of Saint Peter at Westminster, and their Successors, to make and grant unto James Mallors a Lease or Leases of certain Pieces of Ground, Messuages, Tenements, and Hereditaments, comprized within certain Limits, for a longer Term of Years than they are at present enabled to grant.
Gwynne's Estate Act 1757	31 Geo. 2. c. 41 Pr.	20 June 1758
An Act for Sale of the Estates of Marmaduke Gwynne Esquire in the County of Pembroke, to discharge Encumbrances affecting the same; and for other Purposes therein mentioned.

=== Sources ===
- Pickering, Danby, ed. (1766). The Statutes at Large. Vol. 22: From the 30th to the 33d Year of King George II. Cambridge: Joseph Bentham – via Internet Archive.
- Pickering, Danby, ed. (1766). The Statutes at Large. Vol. 22: From the 30th to the 33d Year of King George II. Cambridge: Joseph Bentham. pp. 196–399 – via Google Books.
- Pickering, Danby, ed. (1766). The Statutes at Large. Vol. 22: From the 30th to the 33d Year of King George II. Cambridge: Joseph Bentham – via Internet Archive.
- Journals of the House of Commons. Vol. 28. London: His Majesty's Stationery Office. 1803. pp. 3–315 – via Google Books.
- Chronological Table of and Index to the Statutes. Vol. 1: To the End of the Session 59 Vict. Sess. 2 (1895) (13th ed.). London: Her Majesty's Stationery Office. 1896. pp. 118–119 – via Google Books.

== See also ==
- List of acts of the Parliament of Great Britain
