= Brown bread (disambiguation) =

Brown bread is bread made with significant amounts of whole grain flour.

Brown bread may also refer to:

- Freddie Foreman (1932–2026), known as "Brown Bread Fred"
- Cockney rhyming slang for dead
- Making of Bread, etc. Act 1800, also known as the Brown Bread Act
