= Maxey, Cambridgeshire =

Village in Cambridgeshire, England

Coordinates: 52.660°N 0.334°W

Maxey
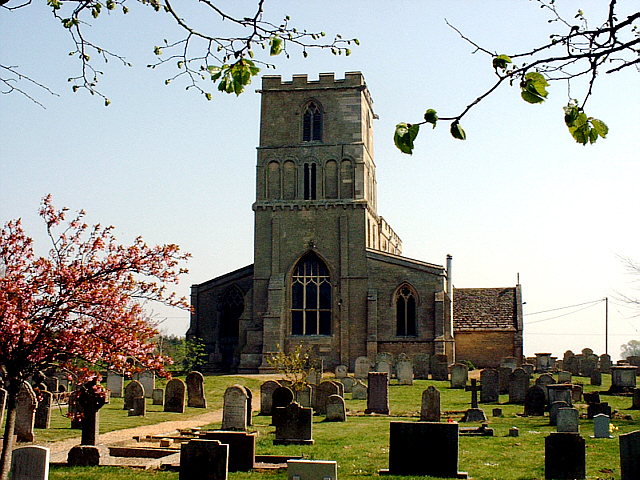
- St Peter's Church

- Location within Cambridgeshire
- OS grid reference: TF125085
- Unitary authority: Peterborough
- Ceremonial county: Cambridgeshire
- Region: East
- Country: England
- Sovereign state: United Kingdom
- Post town: Peterborough
- Postcode district: PE6

Maxey is a village in the Peterborough unitary authority, in the ceremonial county of Cambridgeshire, England, located between Peterborough and Stamford and southwest of The Deepings. It is home to nearly 700 residents.

The main focal points are the one remaining public house (Blue Bell), the Church (St Peter's) and the village hall. Each provides a range of social functions throughout the year. There are a surprising number of businesses based in the village, including a few working farms.

== History ==
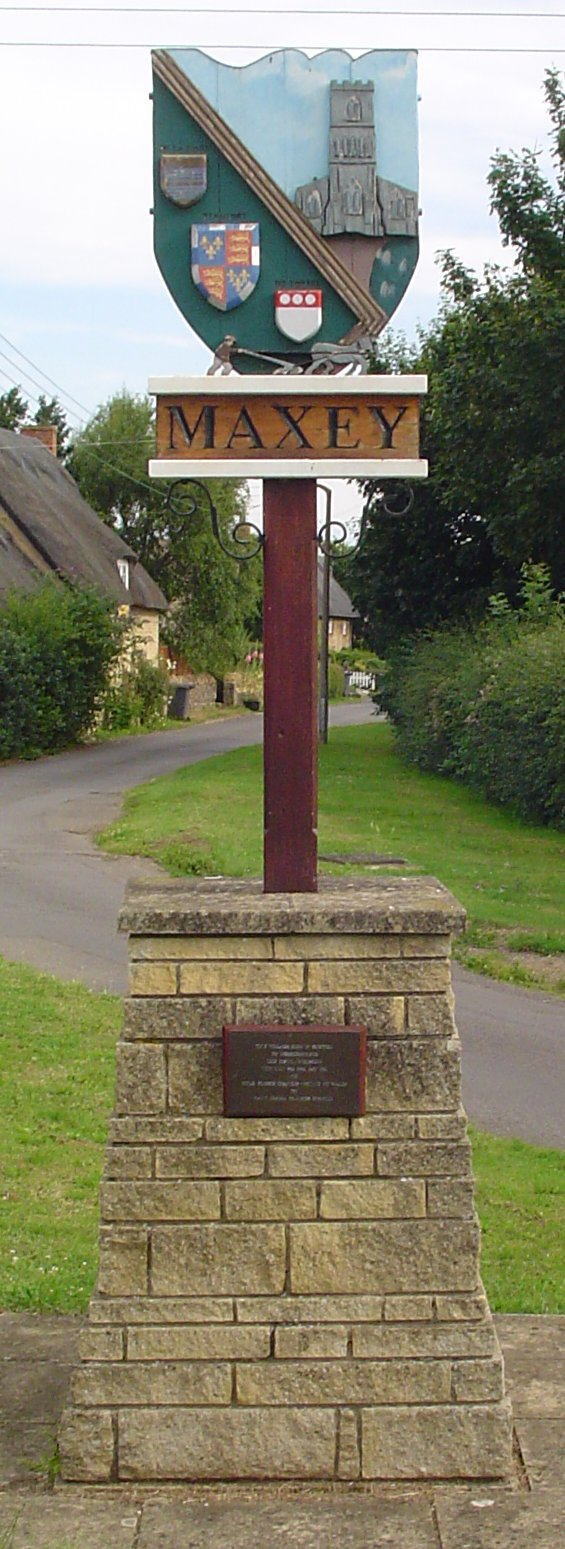
Village sign in Maxey

Once part of the Soke of Peterborough in Northamptonshire, Maxey can trace its 'modern' roots back over 1,000 years. However, archaeological excavation of the area has provided ample evidence of continuous occupation for over 4,000 years. Lolham Bridges, on the outskirts of Maxey between Helpston and Bainton, were originally built in the Roman era to carry King Street over the floodplain of the River Welland.

Rescue archaeology before gravel workings began revealed details of a large henge in Maxey. Discovered from aerial photographs in 1956 by J. K. St Joseph and last excavated by Francis Pryor in 1979-1981, the henge was 126 metres in diameter, one of the largest known. It was part of an entire landscape of Neolithic features, including a cursus and barrows. Along with the large and mysterious ritual village at nearby Etton, this collection of sites has featured in Pryor's writing about large-scale ritual landscapes.

The village web site has a detailed account of life in Maxey between the 9th and 12th centuries.

== Surname ==
If your family has an uninterrupted bloodline, and no one decided to change their name by deed poll or similar, then you can be reasonably certain that anyone with the surname Maxey (or close derivative, i.e. Maxcy) has their ancestral origins in the village/environs of Maxey.

== Businesses ==
- Shaw's Coaches, Maxey. Bus services and coach outings
- Blue Bell Public House
- M.C Vehicle Engineers

== Notable people ==
- Sarah Cawood (born 1972), broadcaster
- George Robinson (born 1997), actor

== See also ==
- Lolham
- Maxey Castle
- Tom Bloodworth (1882 – 1974), New Zealand politician, born in Maxey
- Glen Maxey
- Marlon Maxey
- Samuel B. Maxey
- Macksey
- Maxie (disambiguation)
