= Making of Bread Act 1757 =

Act of the Parliament of Great Britain

- Act of Parliament
- Parliament of Great Britain
- Long title: An Act for the due making of bread; and to regulate the price and assize thereof; and to punish persons who shall adulterate meal, flour, or bread.
- Citation: 31 Geo. 2. c. 29
- Territorial extent: Great Britain

Dates
- Royal assent: 20 June 1758
- Commencement: 1 December 1757 (Note: Start of session.)
- Repealed: 15 July 1867
Other legislation
Amends	Assize of Bread and Ale
Repeals/revokes	Price and Assise of Bread Act 1709
Repealed by	Statute Law Revision Act 1867
Relates to	Making of Bread, etc. Act 1800

Status: Repealed

Text of statute as originally enacted

The Making of Bread Act 1757 (31 Geo. 2. c. 29) was an act of the Parliament of Great Britain, which aimed to protect the making of bread and punish those that adulterated it, for the purposes of protecting public health. It was introduced after a report accused bakers of using alum, chalk and powdered bones to keep bread white.

== Background ==
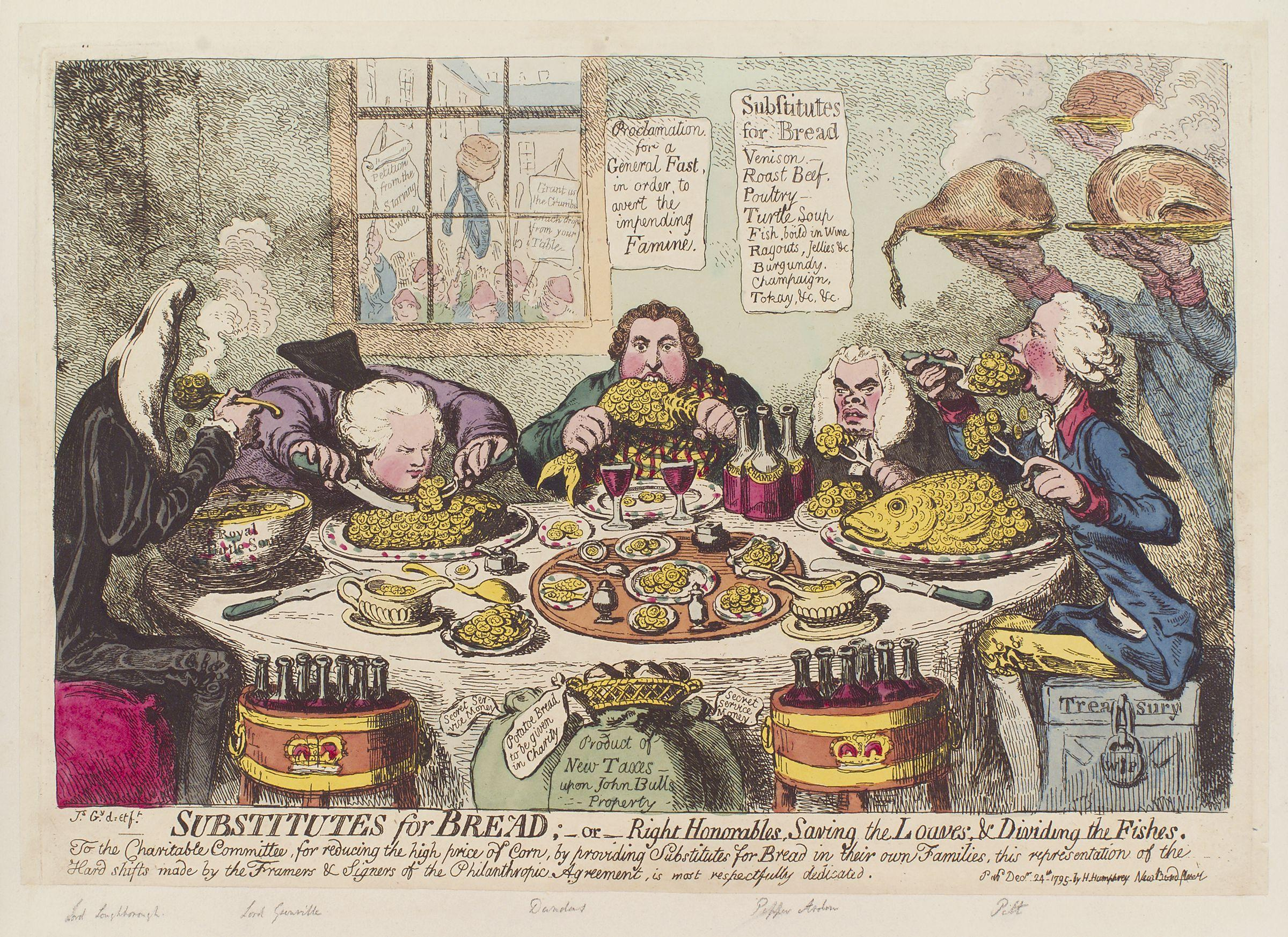
Substitutes for bread; - or - Right Honourables, saving the loaves, and dividing the fishes by James Gillray

In England, the regulation of bread was often a priority for the English – and later British – governments since at least the thirteenth century. Prior to the mid-eighteenth century, selling underweight bread was a punishable offence, and thus sometimes stones were used to increase the weight of bread to avoid the regulation.

As white bread became preferable, so did the adding of alum. The concept that a baker could add chalk or bone triggered a riot in Manchester. Making white bread meant discarding part of the edible wholegrain, and which was discouraged during times of food shortage. Bakers in 1735 complained about the poor quality of flour they received. Traditionally an exporter of wheat, after 1750, England began importing it, with the consequence of rising prices of bread.

The originating bill was introduced after a report accused bakers of using alum lime, chalk and powdered bones to keep bread white, and was passed and published in 1757.

== The act ==
The act aimed to protect the making of bread and punish those that adulterated it. It generally related to London, with the aim of changing people's behaviour in bread consumption. In order to persuade bakers to make and sell household bread, the act abolished the traditional White and Wheaten grades.

== Effects ==
The act had little effect on eating habits in London, with respect to bread, and people continued to prefer the old Wheaten bread to the new household type.

== Subsequent developments ==
The whole act was repealed by section 1 of, and the schedule to, the Statute Law Revision Act 1867 (30 & 31 Vict. c. 59), which came into force on 15 July 1867.

== See also ==
- Making of Bread, etc. Act 1800
- Assize of Bread and Ale

== Bibliography ==
- Cockayne, Emily (2007). Hubbub: Filth, Noise, and Stench in England, 1600-1770. Yale University Press. ISBN 978-0-300-11214-6.
- Petersen, Christian; Jenkins, Andrew (2017). Bread and the British Economy, 1770–1870. Routledge. ISBN 978-1-85928-117-8.
- Rhys-Taylor, Alex (12 May 2020). Food and Multiculture: A Sensory Ethnography of East London. Routledge. ISBN 978-1-000-18173-9.
