= Lolham =

Hamlet in Peterborough, England

Coordinates: 52°39′23″N 0°21′31″W

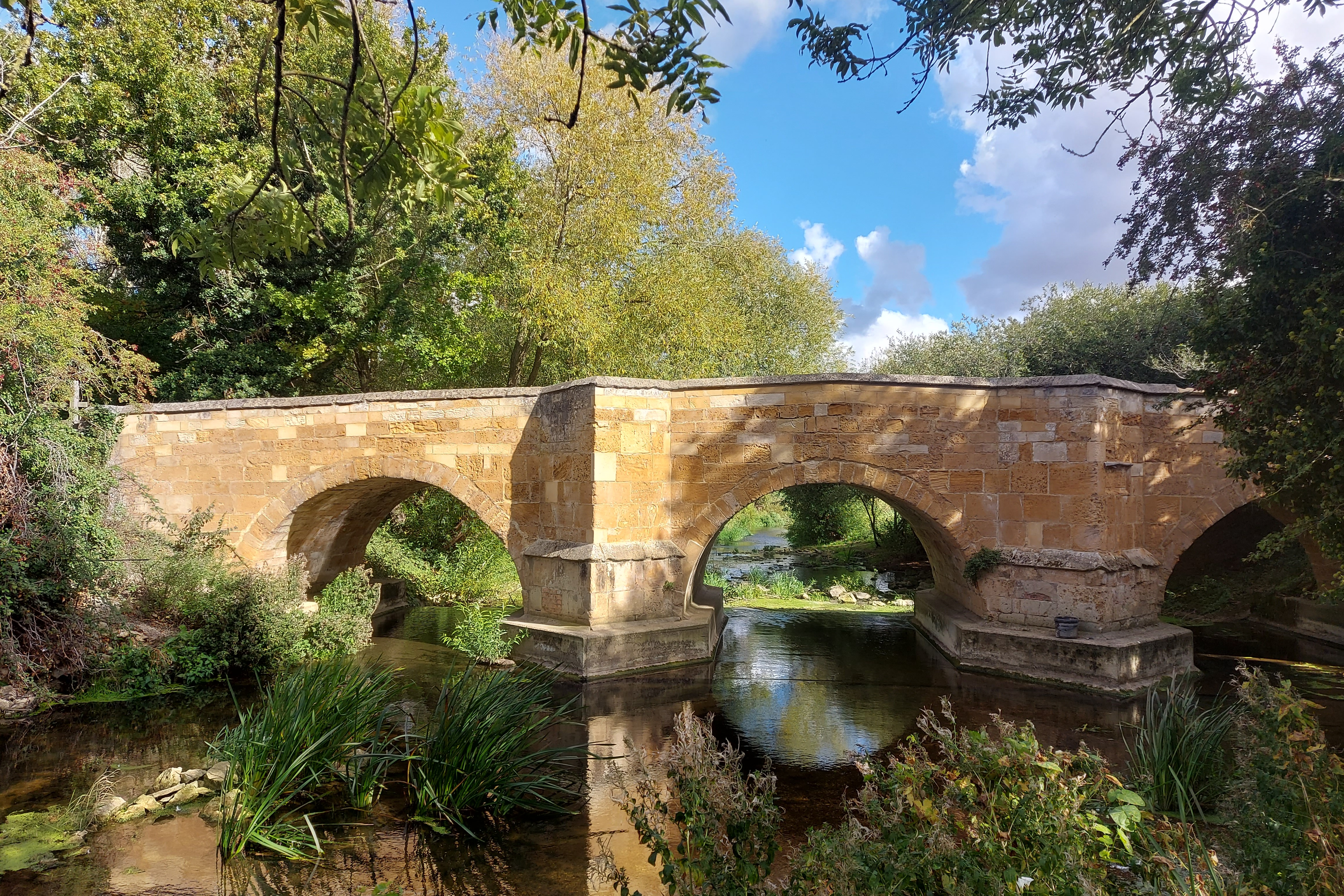
One of the Lolham Bridges taking King Street over the Maxey Cut

Lolham is a hamlet in the City of Peterborough in England, located between Peterborough and Stamford on the border of Cambridgeshire and Lincolnshire. Lolham is located to the west of Maxey and to the south of West Deeping and is surrounded by the River Welland and Maxey Cut. There are eight residential properties in Lolham, which include Lolham Hall, a Grade II listed building. The main London-to-Edinburgh railway (the East Coast Main Line) runs to the west of Lolham.

The Roman road now called King Street crossed the Welland floodplain here. Lolham is known for its bridges that run north across two railway crossings from Helpston to West Deeping.

Where King Street crosses the Maxey Cut, to the south of the original channels, there are a series of 14 arches which comprise Lolham Bridges. They are grouped into five structures to cross the channels in the area, and were funded by the County of Northamptonshire in the seventeenth and eighteenth centuries. The longest span is 16 feet (4.9 m), and the cutwaters carry inscribed stones recording the county's involvement. To the north, an early nineteenth-century stone rubble arched bridge carries the road over a drainage ditch near Lolham Mill, while an eighteenth-century bridge, probably rebuilt in the following century, crosses the mill stream. Another pair of early nineteenth-century bridges, built of coursed limestone with ashlar dressings, carry the road over the northernmost channel. Lolham Bridges is/are a Grade II* listed building.

John Clare described the crossings in his poem called "The Flood":

On Lolham Brigs in wild and lonely mood
I've seen the winter floods their gambols play
Through each old arch that trembled while I stood
Bent o'er its wall to watch the dashing spray.
