= Making of Bread, etc. Act 1800 =

Act of the Parliament of Great Britain

- Act of Parliament
- Parliament of Great Britain
- Long title: An Act to prevent, until the sixth Day of November one thousand eight hundred and one, and from thence to the End of six Weeks from the Commencement of the then next Session of Parliament, the manufacturing of any Fine Flour from Wheat, or other Grain, and the making of any Bread solely from the Fine Flour of Wheat; and to repeal an Act, passed in the thirty-sixth Year of the Reign of His present Majesty, for permitting Bakers to make and sell certain Sorts of Bread, and to make more effectual Provision for the same.
- Citation: 41 Geo. 3. (G.B.) c. 16
- Territorial extent: Great Britain

Dates
- Royal assent: 24 March 1801
- Commencement: 24 March 1801 (Note: The Acts of Parliament (Commencement) Act 1793.)
- Repealed: 24 February 1801
Other legislation
Repealed by	Use of Fine Flour (No. 2) Act 1801
Relates to	Making of Bread Act 1757

Status: Repealed

Text of statute as originally enacted

The Making of Bread, etc. Act 1800 (41 Geo. 3. (G.B.) c. 16), also called the Making of Bread Act 1800, popularly named the Brown Bread Act or the Poison Act, was an act of the Parliament of Great Britain that prohibited millers from producing any flour other than wholemeal flour.

== Background ==
The act was introduced as one of a series of measures to deal with a severe food shortage, caused at least partly by the poor wheat harvest of 1799. Labourers and their families at that time lived very largely on bread, the price of which could account for more than half of their weekly wages.

== The act ==
The act directed that only wholemeal flour was to be produced.

== Effect ==
The act proved to be very unpopular, and impossible to enforce. So concerned was the government by the civil unrest that resulted, the act was repealed after less than two months by the Use of Fine Flour (No. 2) Act 1801 (41 Geo. 3. (U.K.). c. 2). One account from Horsham, in Sussex, demonstrates the depth of public feeling:

A number of women ... proceeded to Gosden wind-mill, where, abusing the miller for having served them with brown flour, they seized on the cloth with which he was then dressing meal according to the directions of the Bread Act, and cut it into a thousand pieces; threatening at the same time to serve all similar utensils he might in future attempt to use in the same manner.

== See also ==
- Making of Bread Act 1757

== Bibliography ==
- Heckscher, Eli F. (1922). Westergaard, Harald (ed.). The Continental System: An Economic Interpretation. Translated by Fearenside, C. S. Clarendon Press.
- Thompson, E. P. (1991). "The Moral Economy of the English Crowd in the Eighteenth Century". Customs in Common. Merlin Press. pp. 185–258. ISBN 978-0-85036-411-8.
- Steedman, Carolyn (5 December 2013). An Everyday Life of the English Working Class: Work, Self and Sociability in the Early Nineteenth Century. Cambridge University Press. ISBN 9781107513396.
