= Maxie (disambiguation) =

Maxie is a given name, a nickname and a surname. It may also refer to:

== Films ==
- Maxie (1954 film), an Austrian film
- Maxie (1985 film), a fantasy movie starring Glenn Close
- The Butchers, a 1970 horror film originally release as Maxie

== Places ==
- Maxie, Louisiana, Acadia Parish, Louisiana, United States, an unincorporated community
- Maxie, Mississippi, United States, an unincorporated community
- Maxie, Virginia, United States, an unincorporated community
- Maxie Theatre, Trumann, Arkansas, United States, on the National Register of Historic Places

== See also ==
- Maxey (disambiguation)
