= Macksey =

Macksey is a surname. Notable people with the surname include:

- Kenneth Macksey (1923–2005), British historian and military writer
- Richard Macksey (1931–2019), American academic
