= Maxey Castle =

- Maxey, Cambridgeshire, England grid reference TF129088

Site information
- Type: Fortified Manor House
- Condition: Moat earthworks remain

Location
- Shown within Cambridgeshire
- Coordinates: 52.6648°N 0.3304°W

Maxey Castle was a medieval fortified manor house castle in Maxey, Cambridgeshire, England.

== Details ==
Maxey Castle was built around the 1370s by William Thorpe near the village of Maxey. The castle had a double moat, possibly designed as a flood defence, with a central keep within a bailey wall with corner towers. Margaret Beaufort, Countess of Richmond and of Derby, and mother of King Henry VII lived here in the 15th century.

Only the partial remains of the moats survive of the castle, which have scheduled monument status.

== See also ==
- Castles in Great Britain and Ireland
- List of castles in England
