= List of acts of the Parliament of Great Britain from 1708 =

This is a complete list of acts of the Parliament of Great Britain for the year 1708.

For acts passed until 1707, see the list of acts of the Parliament of England and the list of acts of the Parliament of Scotland. See also the list of acts of the Parliament of Ireland.

For acts passed from 1801 onwards, see the list of acts of the Parliament of the United Kingdom. For acts of the devolved parliaments and assemblies in the United Kingdom, see the list of acts of the Scottish Parliament, the list of acts of the Northern Ireland Assembly, and the list of acts and measures of Senedd Cymru; see also the list of acts of the Parliament of Northern Ireland.

The number shown after each act's title is its chapter number. Acts are cited using this number, preceded by the year(s) of the reign during which the relevant parliamentary session was held; thus the Union with Ireland Act 1800 is cited as "39 & 40 Geo. 3. c. 67", meaning the 67th act passed during the session that started in the 39th year of the reign of George III and which finished in the 40th year of that reign. Note that the modern convention is to use Arabic numerals in citations (thus "41 Geo. 3" rather than "41 Geo. III"). Acts of the last session of the Parliament of Great Britain and the first session of the Parliament of the United Kingdom are both cited as "41 Geo. 3".

Acts passed by the Parliament of Great Britain did not have a short title; however, some of these acts have subsequently been given a short title by acts of the Parliament of the United Kingdom (such as the Short Titles Act 1896).

Before the Acts of Parliament (Commencement) Act 1793 came into force on 8 April 1793, acts passed by the Parliament of Great Britain were deemed to have come into effect on the first day of the session in which they were passed. Because of this, the years given in the list below may in fact be the year before a particular act was passed.

== 7 Ann. ==
The first session of the 2nd Parliament of Great Britain, which met from 16 November 1708 until 21 April 1709.

This session was also traditionally cited as 7 Anne or 7 A.

=== Public acts ===
Short title	Citation	Royal assent
Long title
Land Tax Act 1708 (repealed)	7 Ann. c. 1	23 December 1708
An Act for granting an Aid to Her Majesty, to be raised by a Land Tax in Great Britain, for the Service of the Year One Thousand Seven Hundred and Nine. (Repealed by Statute Law Revision Act 1867 (30 & 31 Vict. c. 59))
Recruiting Act 1708 (repealed)	7 Ann. c. 2	26 January 1709
An Act for the speedy and effectual recruiting Her Majesty's Land Forces and Marines, for the Service of the Year One Thousand Seven Hundred and Nine. (Repealed by Statute Law Revision Act 1867 (30 & 31 Vict. c. 59))
Taxation Act 1708 (repealed)	7 Ann. c. 3	24 February 1709
An Act for charging and continuing the Duties upon Malt, Mum, Cyder, and Perry, for the Service of the Year One Thousand Seven Hundred and Nine. (Repealed by Statute Law Revision Act 1867 (30 & 31 Vict. c. 59))
Mutiny Act 1708 (repealed)	7 Ann. c. 4	23 March 1709
An Act for punishing Mutiny and Desertion, and false Musters; and for the better Payment of the Army and Quarters. (Repealed by Statute Law Revision Act 1867 (30 & 31 Vict. c. 59))
Foreign Protestants Naturalization Act 1708 or the Foreign and Protestants Naturalization Act 1708 or the Foreign Protestants (Naturalization) Act 1708 (repealed)	7 Ann. c. 5	23 March 1709
An Act for naturalizing Foreign Protestants. (Repealed by British Nationality and Status of Aliens Act 1914 (4 & 5 Geo. 5. c. 17))
Smithfield Market, etc. Act 1708 (repealed)	7 Ann. c. 6	23 March 1709
An Act for explaining and making more effectual that Part of an Act passed in the Fifth Year of Her present Majesty's Reign, concerning the buying and selling of Cattle in Smithfield; (Note: Continuance of Laws Act 1706 (6 Ann. c. 34)) and for giving Leave for bringing up Calves dead to London, as formerly. (Repealed by Statute Law Revision Act 1867 (30 & 31 Vict. c. 59))
Whitby Piers Act 1708 (repealed)	7 Ann. c. 7 (Note: This is the chapter in The Statutes of the Realm.); 7 Ann. c. 1 Pr. (Note: This is the chapter in The Statutes at Large.)	24 February 1709
An Act for continuing an Act made in the First Year of Her Majesty's Reign, intituled, "An Act for the rebuilding and repairing the Piers of the Town and Port of Whitby, in the County of York." (Note: Whitby Piers Act 1702 (1 Ann. c. 13)) (Repealed by Whitby Piers and Harbour Act 1827 (7 & 8 Geo. 4. c. lxxviii))
Norfolk Highways Act 1708 (repealed)	7 Ann. c. 8; 7 Ann. c. 4 Pr.	23 March 1709
An Act for continuing an Act, made in the Seventh and Eighth Years of the Reign of His late Majesty King William, intituled, "An Act for the repairing the Highways between Wymondham and Attleborough, in the County of Norfolk;" (Note: Norfolk Roads Act 1695 (7 & 8 Will. 3. c. 26)) and for including therein the Road leading from Wymondham to Hethersett, over the Commons belonging to the said Towns. (Repealed by Norfolk Roads Act 1766 (7 Geo. 3. c. 76))
Whitehaven Harbour Act 1708	7 Ann. c. 9; 7 Ann. c. 5 Pr.	23 March 1709
An Act for preserving and enlarging the Harbour of Whitehaven, in the County of Cumberland.
Charities of John Pierrepont Act 1708	7 Ann. c. 10; 7 Ann. c. 27 Pr.	21 April 1709
An Act for better establishing certain Charities of John Pierrepont.
Salt Duties Act 1708 (repealed)	7 Ann. c. 11	21 April 1709
An Act for ascertaining and directing the Payment of the Allowances to be made, for or upon the Exportation from Scotland of Fish, Beef, and Pork, cured with Foreign Salt imported before the First Day of May One Thousand Seven Hundred and Seven; and for disposing such Salt, still remaining in the Hands of Her Majesty's Subjects there; and for ascertaining and securing the Allowances for Fish and Flesh exported, and to be exported, from Scotland, for the future. (Repealed by Statute Law Revision Act 1867 (30 & 31 Vict. c. 59))
Diplomatic Privileges Act 1708 (repealed)	7 Ann. c. 12	21 April 1709
An Act for preserving the Privileges of Ambassadors and other publick Ministers of Foreign Princes and States. (Repealed by Diplomatic Privileges Act 1964 (c. 81))
Woollen Cloth Act 1708 (repealed)	7 Ann. c. 13	21 April 1709
An Act for the better ascertaining the Lengths and Breadths of Woollen Cloth made in the County of York. (Repealed by Woollen Manufacture Act 1809 (49 Geo. 3. c. 109))
Parochial Libraries Act 1708 (repealed)	7 Ann. c. 14	21 April 1709
An Act for the better Preservation of Parochial Libraries, in that Part of Great Britain called England. (Repealed by Ecclesiastical Jurisdiction and Care of Churches Measure 2018 (No. 3))
Alteration of Terms in Scotland Act 1708 (repealed)	7 Ann. c. 15	21 April 1709
An Act for altering Whitsontide and Lammas Terms, for the Court of Exchequer in Scotland. (Repealed by Statute Law Revision Act 1867 (30 & 31 Vict. c. 59))
Wagers Act 1708 (repealed)	7 Ann. c. 16	21 April 1709
An Act to prevent the laying of Wagers relating to the publick. (Repealed by Statute Law Revision Act 1867 (30 & 31 Vict. c. 59))
Mischiefs by Fire Act 1708 or the London Building Act 1708 or the London Building Act 1709 or the Building Regulation Act 1709 (repealed)	7 Ann. c. 17	21 April 1709
An Act for making more effectual an Act made in the Sixth Year of Her Majesty's Reign, (Note: Mischiefs from Fire Act 1707 (6 Ann. c. 58)) for the better preventing of Mischiefs that may happen by Fire. (Repealed by Metropolitan Buildings Act 1772 (12 Geo. 3. c. 73))
Advowsons Act 1708 (repealed)	7 Ann. c. 18	21 April 1709
An Act to preserve the Rights of Patrons to Advowsons. (Repealed by Statute Law (Repeals) Act 1969 (c. 52))
Trust or Mortgage Estates Act 1708 (repealed)	7 Ann. c. 19	21 April 1709
An Act to enable Infants, who are seised or possessed of Estates in Fee in Trust, or by Way of Mortgage, to make Conveyances of such Estates. (Repealed by Infants, Lunatics, etc. Act 1825 (6 Geo. 4. c. 74))
Middlesex Registry Act 1708 (repealed)	7 Ann. c. 20	21 April 1709
An Act for the Public registring of Deeds, Conveyances, and Wills, and other Incumbrances, which shall be made of, or that may affect any Honours, Manors, Lands, Tenements, or Hereditaments, within the County of Middlesex, after the Twenty-ninth Day of September One Thousand Seven Hundred and Nine. (Repealed by Criminal Statutes Repeal Act 1861 (24 & 25 Vict. c. 95), Statute Law Revision Act 1887 (50 & 51 Vict. c. 59), Land Registry (Middlesex Deeds) Act 1891 (54 & 55 Vict. c. 64) and Statute Law Revision Act 1948 (11 & 12 Geo. 6. c. 62))
Treason Act 1708	7 Ann. c. 21	21 April 1709
An Act for improving the Union of the Two Kingdoms.
General Pardon Act 1708 (repealed)	7 Ann. c. 22	21 April 1709
An Act for the Queen's most Gracious General and Free Pardon. (Repealed by Statute Law Revision Act 1867 (30 & 31 Vict. c. 59))
Militia Act 1708 (repealed)	7 Ann. c. 23	21 April 1709
An Act for raising the Militia for the Year One Thousand Seven Hundred and Nine, although the Month's Pay formerly advanced be not re-paid. (Repealed by Statute Law Revision Act 1867 (30 & 31 Vict. c. 59))
Coinage Act 1708 (repealed)	7 Ann. c. 24	21 April 1709
An Act for continuing the former Acts for the Encouragement of the Coinage; and to encourage the bringing Foreign Coins, and British or Foreign Plate, to be coined; and for making Provision for the Mints in Scotland; and for the prosecuting Offences concerning the Coin in England. (Repealed by Statute Law Revision Act 1867 (30 & 31 Vict. c. 59))
Perpetuation, etc. of Acts 1708 (repealed)	7 Ann. c. 25	21 April 1709
An Act for making perpetual an Act (Note: Coin Act 1696 (8 & 9 Will. 3. c. 26)) for the better preventing the counterfeiting the current Coin of this Kingdom; as also an Act (Note: Bills of Exchange Act 1704 (3 & 4 Ann. c. 8)) for giving like Remedy upon Promissory Notes as is used upon Bills of Exchange, and for the better Payment of Inland Bills of Exchange; and also for continuing several Acts made in the Fourth and Fifth Years of Her Majesty's Reign, for preventing Frauds committed by Bankrupts. (Repealed by Statute Law Revision Act 1867 (30 & 31 Vict. c. 59))
Fortifications Act 1708	7 Ann. c. 26	21 April 1709
An Act for appointing Commissioners, to treat and agree for such Lands, Tenements, and Hereditaments, as shall be judged proper to be purchased, for the better fortifying Portsmouth, Chatham, and Harwich.
Morrison's Haven and Fort (East Lothian) Act 1708 (repealed)	7 Ann. c. 27; 7 Ann. c. 12 Pr.	21 April 1709
An Act for repairing and improving of Morison's Haven, and the Fort there, in the Shire of East Lothian, alias Hadingtoun. (Repealed by Statute Law (Repeals) Act 1998 (c. 43))
Manchester (Church Building) Act 1708	7 Ann. c. 28; 7 Ann. c. 6 Pr.	23 March 1709
An Act for building a Church, or Chapel, in the Town of Manchester, in the County of Lancaster.
Earl of Clanriccard's Estates Act 1708 (repealed)	7 Ann. c. 29; 7 Ann. c. 41 Pr.	21 April 1709
An Act for the Relief of the Earl of Clanriccard (lately called Lord Bophin) of the Kingdom of Ireland, in relation to his Estate; and for the more effectual selling or setting the Estate of the said Earl to Protestants. (Repealed by Statute Law (Repeals) Act 1978 (c. 45))
Bank of England Act 1708 (repealed)	7 Ann. c. 30; 7 Ann. c. 7	21 April 1709
An Act for enlarging the Capital Stock of the Bank of England; and for raising a further Supply to Her Majesty, for the Service of the Year One Thousand Seven Hundred and Nine. (Repealed by Statute Law Revision Act 1867 (30 & 31 Vict. c. 59), Statute Law Revision Act 1887 (50 & 51 Vict. c. 59), Bank Act 1892 (55 & 56 Vict. c. 48), Bank of England Act 1946 (9 & 10 Geo. 6. c. 27) and Statute Law Revision Act 1948 (11 & 12 Geo. 6. c. 62))
Continuance of Certain Duties, etc. Act 1708 (repealed)	7 Ann. c. 31; 7 Ann. c. 8	21 April 1709
An Act for continuing several Impositions and Duties, to raise Money, by Way of Loan; and for exporting British Copper and Brass Wire, Duty-free; and for circulating a further Sum in Exchequer Bills, in case a new Contract be made in that Behalf; and concerning the Oaths to be administered in relation to Italian Thrown Silks; and touching Oils and Plantation Goods of Foreigners, taken, or to be taken, as Prize; and concerning Drugs of America, to be imported from Her Majesty's Plantations; and for appropriating the Monies given in this Session of Parliament; and for making out Debentures for Two Transport Ships in this Act named; and to allow a further Time for registering certain Debentures; and for Relief of Persons who have lost such Tickets, Exchequer Bills, Debentures, Tallies, or Orders, as in this Act are mentioned. (Repealed by Statute Law Revision Act 1867 (30 & 31 Vict. c. 59))
Commissioners of Sewers (City of London) Act 1708 (repealed)	7 Ann. c. 32; 7 Ann. c. 9	21 April 1709
An Act for giving the Commissioners of Sewers for the City of London the same Powers as the Commissioners of Sewers for Counties have; and to oblige Collectors for the Sewers to account. (Repealed by Statute Law Revision Act 1953 (2 & 3 Eliz. 2. c. 5))
Commissions of Sewers Act 1708 or the Commissioners of Sewers Act 1708 (repealed)	7 Ann. c. 33; 7 Ann. c. 10	21 April 1709
An Act for rendring more effectual the Laws concerning Commissions of Sewers. (Repealed by Land Drainage Act 1930 (20 & 21 Geo. 5. c. 44))
St. Philip's Church (Birmingham) Act 1708	7 Ann. c. 34; 7 Ann. c. 13 Pr.	21 April 1709
An Act for building a Parish Church and Parsonage-house, and making a new Church-yard, and a new Parish, in Birmingham, in the County of Warwick, to be called The Parish of St. Philip. Further information: St Philip's Cathedral, Birmingham

=== Private acts ===
Short title	Citation	Royal assent
Long title
Duffus' Naturalization Act 1708	7 Ann. c. 1 Pr. (Note: This is the chapter in The Statutes of the Realm.); 7 Ann. c. 2 Pr. (Note: This is the chapter in The Statutes at Large.)	24 February 1709
An Act for naturalizing Charlotta Christiana Lady Duffus.
Sainthill's Name Act 1708	7 Ann. c. 2 Pr. 7 Ann. c. 3 Pr.	24 February 1709
An Act to enable Edward Sainthill (late Edward Yard) Esquire to change his Surname from Yard to Sainthill, according to the Will of Samuel Sainthill Esquire, deceased.
Offley's Name Act 1708	7 Ann. c. 3 Pr. 7 Ann. c. 7 Pr.	23 March 1709
An Act to enable Anne Crewe (late Offley) Widow, and John Crewe (late Offley) her Son and Heir Apparent, to change their Surnames from Offley to Crewe, according to the Settlement of John Crewe Esquire, deceased.
Stafford's Estate Act 1708	7 Ann. c. 4 Pr. 7 Ann. c. 8 Pr.	23 March 1709
An Act for vesting in Trustees the Reversion of several Lands and Tenements expectant on Leases for Lives, the Estate of Hugh Stafford, of Pynes, in the County of Devon, Esquire, to be sold, for Payment of Debts; and, by discharging his Power of leasing, to secure other Lands, to come into Possession to his Son, in Lieu thereof.
Enabling William Collins, Thomas Parrat and William Day to dispose of lands for payment of John Granger's debts and for making provision for the widow and younger children of Nicholas Granger, his late father.	7 Ann. c. 5 Pr. 7 Ann. c. 9 Pr.	23 March 1709
An Act to enable William Collins Clerk, Thomas Parrat and William Day Gentlemen, to dispose of certain Lands, for the Payment of the Debts of John Granger; and for making of Provision for the Widow and Younger Children of Nicholas Granger, his late Father, deceased.
Penne's Estate Act 1708	7 Ann. c. 6 Pr. 7 Ann. c. 10 Pr.	23 March 1709
An Act for further enabling George Penne Esquire to sell Lands, for the Payment of his Debts, by enlarging a Trust for that Purpose contained in a former Act, intituled, "An Act for enabling George Penne Esquire to sell Lands, for the Payment of his Debts, and other Purposes therein mentioned." (Note: Penne's Estate Act 1698 (10 Will. 3. c. 12 Pr.))
Naturalizing Lewis de Rosset, Peter Brozet and Others Act 1708	7 Ann. c. 7 Pr. 7 Ann. c. 11 Pr.	23 March 1709
An Act for naturalizing Lewis de Rosset, Peter Brozet, and others.
Duke of Newcastle's Estate Act 1708	7 Ann. c. 8 Pr. 7 Ann. c. 14 Pr.	21 April 1709
An Act for vesting in John Duke of Newcastle and his Heirs certain Lands belonging to the Vicarage of Walesby, in the County of Nottingham, in Lieu of an Annual Rent of Ten Pounds per Annum, payable to the Vicar of the said Vicarage and his Successors for ever.
Earl of Plymouth's Estate Act 1708	7 Ann. c. 9 Pr. 7 Ann. c. 15 Pr.	21 April 1709
An Act to vest the Estates which came to the Right Honourable Other Earl of Plimouth by his Mother, in Trustees, to be sold, for raising Money, to pay off Debts charged upon his Paternal Estate; and to enable him to cut Coppices.
Bishopric of Chichester's Estate Act 1708	7 Ann. c. 10 Pr. 7 Ann. c. 16 Pr.	21 April 1709
An Act for the explaining and making more effectual an Act made Anno Primo Annæ Reginæ, intituled, "An Act giving further Time to John Lord Bishop of Chichester, and his Successors, to make Leases of certain Houses and Ground, in and near Chancery Lane, belonging to the Bishopric of Chichester." (Note: Bishopric of Chichester's Estate Act 1702 (1 Ann. St. 2. c. 5 Pr.))
Estates of Willoughby de Broke and others (jointures): explaining a clause in an Act concerning the partition of lands between the heirs of Lord Broke.	7 Ann. c. 11 Pr. 7 Ann. c. 17 Pr.	21 April 1709
An Act to explain a Clause in a Statute made in the Seven and Twentieth Year of the Reign of King Henry the Eighth, (Note: Partition of Lands between the heirs of Lord Broke Act 1535 (27 Hen. 8. c. 44)) enabling Tenants in Tail, in Possession, to make Jointures to Wives; and enlarging the same, so as Richard Lord Willughby de Broke and others, Tenants in Tail in Possession, may make Jointures to the Wives of their Eldest Sons or Grandsons.
Lord Powlett's Estate Act 1708	7 Ann. c. 12 Pr. 7 Ann. c. 18 Pr.	21 April 1709
An Act for vesting some Part of the Estate, in the County of Lincoln, included in the Marriage Settlement of the Right Honourable William Powlett Esquire, commonly called Lord William Powlett, in Trustees, to be sold, for the raising Money to discharge an Incumbrance fallen on the same, by virtue of a Decree of the High Court of Chancery; and to confirm an Agreement made by the said Lord William Powlett with the Right Honourable the Countess Dowager of Bridgewater and the Executor of the late Duke of Bolton, deceased, relating to such Incumbrance.
Enabling William Cecill and others to sell lands for payment of debts charged on his estate by his late father John Earl of Exeter.	7 Ann. c. 13 Pr. 7 Ann. c. 20 Pr.	21 April 1709
An Act to enable the Honourable William Cecil Esquire, with others, to sell Lands, for the Payment of several Debts charged upon his Estate by the Right Honourable John late Earl of Exeter, deceased, his late Father.
Bradshaig's Estate Act 1708	7 Ann. c. 14 Pr. 7 Ann. c. 21 Pr.	21 April 1709
An Act for vesting in Trustees the Fourth Part of a Fourth Part (being the Share of Sir Roger Bradshaigh Baronet) of the Estate of the late Countess of Oxford, to be sold, to pay Portions and Debts; and, with the Remainder of the Money arising by such Sale, to purchase other Lands, to be settled to the same Uses as his Paternal Estate is by his Marriage Settlement.
Reversal of the outlawry and attainder of Christopher Lord Baron of Slane (Ireland).	7 Ann. c. 15 Pr. 7 Ann. c. 22 Pr.	21 April 1709
An Act to reverse the Outlawry and Attainder of Christopher Lord Baron of Slane in Ireland.
Lacy's Estate Act 1708	7 Ann. c. 16 Pr. 7 Ann. c. 23 Pr.	21 April 1709
An act for vesting divers manors, messuages, lands, and tenements of John Lacy, esq; in the counties of Essex, Cambridge, and Middlesex, in trustees, to be sold for payment of his debts, making provision for his children unprovided for, and other purposes therein mentioned.
Gay's Estate Act 1708	7 Ann. c. 17 Pr. 7 Ann. c. 24 Pr.	21 April 1709
An Act for vesting the Seite, Capital Messuage, or Farm, of the Manor of Southstoke, and Lands thereunto belonging, in the County of Somerset, late the Estate of John Gay Gentleman, deceased, in Trustees, to be sold, for the speedier Payment of his Debts, and better Performance of the Trusts therein mentioned.
Empowering the Treasury to compound with the sureties of Samuel Pacey late Receiver General for Suffolk.	7 Ann. c. 18 Pr. 7 Ann. c. 25 Pr.	21 April 1709
An Act to empower the Lord High Treasurer of Great Britain, or Commissioners of the Treasury, to compound with the Sureties of Samuel Pacey, deceased, late Receiver General for the County of Suffolk.
Enabling the Treasury to compound with William Malet for the debt of his father, for whom he was surety while Receiver General of Somerset and Bristol.	7 Ann. c. 19 Pr. 7 Ann. c. 26 Pr.	21 April 1709
An Act to enable the Lord High Treasurer, or Commissioners of the Treasury, for the Time being, to compound with William Malet Esquire, for the Debt of his Father, for whom he was Surety while Receiver General of the County of Somerset and City of Bristol.
Lord Jeffreys' Estate Act 1708	7 Ann. c. 20 Pr. 7 Ann. c. 19 Pr.	21 April 1709
An Act for vesting the Barony of Wem, and Manors of Wem and Loppington, and several Lands and Tenements, in the County of Salop; and the Manors of Dolby and Broughton, and Lands thereto belonging, in the County of Leicester; and the Manor of Fulmer, and several Lands and Tenements, in the County of Bucks; late the Estate of George late Lord Jeffreys, deceased, in Trustees, to be sold, for Payment of Debts and Portions, and other Purposes therein mentioned.
Haydon's Estate Act 1708	7 Ann. c. 21 Pr. 7 Ann. c. 28 Pr.	21 April 1709
An Act for vesting the Estate of Gideon Haydon Esquire, deceased, lying in the County of Devon, in Trustees, to be sold, for Payment of the Debts wherewith it stands incumbered; and settling the Overplus to the Uses in his Marriage Settlement limited and declared.
Better performance of Stephen Hervey's will and making provision for children.	7 Ann. c. 22 Pr. 7 Ann. c. 29 Pr.	21 April 1709
An Act for the better Performance of the Will of Stephen Hervey Esquire, deceased, and making Provision for his Children.
Bagot's Restitution Act 1708	7 Ann. c. 23 Pr. 7 Ann. c. 30 Pr.	21 April 1709
An Act for the Reversal of the Outlawry of Elianor Bagot, the Wife of John Bagot.
Howe's Estate Act 1708	7 Ann. c. 24 Pr. 7 Ann. c. 31 Pr.	21 April 1709
An Act to enable William Howe, of Somerton Early, in the County of Somerset, Esquire, to sell the Manor and Farm of Gunvile Eastbury, alias Tarrant Gunvile, in the County of Dorset, and several Messuages, Lands, Tenements, and Hereditaments, in Gunvile Eastbury, alias Tarrant Gunvile, aforesaid; and to settle other Lands and Hereditaments, of greater Value, to the same Uses to which the said Manor and Premises in Gunvile Eastbury, alias Tarrant Gunvile, now stand limited, in Lieu thereof.
Enabling John Ely to raise money out of his estate to pay his debts, and settling the residue with his wife's estate to the uses of his marriage settlement.	7 Ann. c. 25 Pr. 7 Ann. c. 32 Pr.	21 April 1709
An Act to enable John Elye Esquire to raise Monies out of his Estate, to pay his Debts; and for settling the Residue thereof, together with the Estate of Elizabeth his Wife, to the Uses intended by his Marriage Settlement.
Coldham's Estate Act 1708	7 Ann. c. 26 Pr. 7 Ann. c. 33 Pr.	21 April 1709
An Act for Sale of certain Lands and Annuities late the Estate of John Goldham, of Tooting Graveney, Esquire, deceased, for raising of Portions for his Grandchildren, according to his Will.
Freedom of Ships Barclay Castle and James of Montross Act 1708	7 Ann. c. 27 Pr. 7 Ann. c. 34 Pr.	21 April 1709
An Act for making the Ships The Barclay Castle and James of Montross free Ships.
Payment of the debts of Sir John Bolles, a lunatic.	7 Ann. c. 28 Pr. 7 Ann. c. 35 Pr.	21 April 1709
An Act for the Payment of the Debts of Sir John Bolles Baronet, a Lunatic.
Enabling Thomas Bulkeley to sell part of the estate comprised in his marriage settlement to pay debts.	7 Ann. c. 29 Pr. 7 Ann. c. 36 Pr.	21 April 1709
An Act to enable Thomas Bulkeley Gentleman to sell Part of the Estate comprized in his Marriage Settlement, to pay off Debts, which were precedent to, and do affect, the said Settlement.
Relief of non-commissioned officers and soldiers of the regiments of Colonel Handasyde, Colonel Livesay and Lieutenant General Erle and of the Four Independent Companies at New York.	7 Ann. c. 30 Pr. 7 Ann. c. 37 Pr.	21 April 1709
An Act for the Relief of the Non-commission Officers and Soldiers of the respective Companies of the Three Regiments of Colonel Thomas Handasyde, Colonel John Livesay, and Lieutenant General Erle, and of the Four Independent Companies at New York, in America.
Annexing rectory of Haseley (Oxfordshire) to the deanery of St. George's Chapel, Windsor, and vesting the advowson of the rectory of St. Mary's Church, Berkhamsted (Hertfordshire), in the dean and canons of the chapel in lieu.	7 Ann. c. 31 Pr. 7 Ann. c. 38 Pr.	21 April 1709
An Act for annexing the Rectory or Parsonage of Hasely, in the County of Oxon, to the Deanry of the King's Free Chapel of St. George, within His Castle of Windsor; and for vesting the Advowson of the Rectory and Parochial Church of St. Mary, alias North Church, Barkhamstead, in the County of Hertford, in the Dean and Canons of the King's Free Chapel of St. George, within His Castle of Windsor, in Lieu thereof.
Enabling James Stopford to sell lands in Nottinghamshire for payment of debts and portions.	7 Ann. c. 32 Pr. 7 Ann. c. 39 Pr.	21 April 1709
An Act to enable James Stopford Esquire to sell Lands, in the County of Nottingham, for Payment of Debts and Portions.
Confirmation of a term for 500 years created by Richard Minshull and his trustees for securing the payment of £8000 and interest.	7 Ann. c. 33 Pr. 7 Ann. c. 40 Pr.	21 April 1709
An Act for confirming a Term for Five Hundred Years, created by Richard Minshull Esquire and his Trustees, for securing the Payment of Eight Thousand Pounds and Interest.
Explanation of an Act concerning Edward Whitaker's public money receipts.	7 Ann. c. 34 Pr. 7 Ann. c. 42	21 April 1709
An Act to explain an Act made in the First Year of Her Majesty's Reign, intituled, "An Act to oblige Edward Whitaker to accompt for such Sums of Public Money as hath been received by him." (Note: Edward Whitaker, Public Accountant Act 1702 (1 Ann. St. 2. c. 16))
Enabling Anthony Stafford to sell or mortgage part of his lands in Derbyshire and Cheshire for the payment of his and his father's debts and settling the rest for the benefit of his family.	7 Ann. c. 35 Pr. 7 Ann. c. 43 Pr.	21 April 1709
An Act to enable Anthony Stafford Gentleman to sell or mortgage some Part of his Lands and Hereditaments, in the Counties of Derby and Chester, for the Payment of his Father's Debts and his own; and the better settling and securing the rest, for the Benefit of his Wife and Family.
Nettles' Estate Act 1708	7 Ann. c. 36 Pr. 7 Ann. c. 44 Pr.	21 April 1709
An Act for vesting the Equity of Redemption of the Manor of Backwell, in the County of Somerset, in Trustees, to be sold, pursuant to the Will of Caroletta Nettles, deceased, and a Decree in Chancery.

=== Sources ===
- Raithby, John, ed. (1822). "Anno 7° Annæ, A.D. 1709". The Statutes of the Realm. Vol. 9: The Statutes of the Seventh to the Thirteenth Years of the Reign of Queen Anne. pp. 1–147 – via Internet Archive.
- Raithby, John, ed. (1822). "Anno 7° Annæ, A.D. 1709". The Statutes of the Realm. Vol. 9: The Statutes of the Seventh to the Thirteenth Years of the Reign of Queen Anne. pp. 1–147 – via HathiTrust.
- Pickering, Danby, ed. (1764). "Anno septimo Annæ". The Statutes at Large. Vol. 11: From The Second to the Eighth Year of Queen Anne. Cambridge: Joseph Bentham. pp. 443–517 – via Internet Archive.
- Journals of the House of Commons. Vol. 16. London: His Majesty's Stationery Office. 1803. pp. 3–209 – via Google Books.
- Journal of the House of Lords. Vol. 18: 1705-1709. London: His Majesty's Stationery Office. 1830. pp. 572–731 – via British History Online.
- Chronological Table of and Index to the Statutes. Vol. 1: To the End of the Session 59 Vict. Sess. 2 (1895) (13th ed.). London: Her Majesty's Stationery Office. 1896. pp. 88–89 – via Google Books.
- Chronological Table of the Statutes: Covering the Period from 1235 to the End of 1971. London: Her Majesty's Stationery Office. 1972. pp. 85–86. ISBN 978-0-11-840096-1 – via Google Books.
- "Acts of the Parliament of Great Britain from 1708". legislation.gov.uk. The National Archives.

== See also ==
- List of acts of the Parliament of Great Britain
