= Perpetuation, etc. of Acts 1708 =

Act of the Parliament of Great Britain

- Act of Parliament
- Parliament of Great Britain
- Long title: An Act for making perpetual an Act for the better preventing the counterfeiting the current Coin of this Kingdom; as also an Act for giving like Remedy upon Promissory Notes as is used upon Bills of Exchange, and for the better Payment of Inland Bills of Exchange; and also for continuing several Acts made in the Fourth and Fifth Years of Her Majesty's Reign, for preventing Frauds committed by Bankrupts.
- Citation: 7 Ann. c. 25
- Territorial extent: Great Britain

Dates
- Royal assent: 21 April 1709
- Commencement: 16 November 1708 (Note: Start of session.)
- Repealed: 15 July 1867
Other legislation
Amends	Coin Act 1696; Bills of Exchange Act 1704; Bankruptcy Act 1705; Bankrupts Act 1706
Repealed by	Statute Law Revision Act 1867
Relates to	See Expiring laws continuance acts

Status: Repealed

Text of statute as originally enacted

The Perpetuation, etc. of Acts 1708 (7 Ann. c. 25) was an act of the Parliament of Great Britain that made perpetual various older acts.

== Background ==
In the United Kingdom, acts of Parliament remain in force until expressly repealed. Many acts of parliament, however, contained time-limited sunset clauses, requiring legislation to revive enactments that had expired or to continue enactments that would otherwise expire.

== Provisions ==
Section 1 of the act made the Coin Act 1696 (8 & 9 Will. 3. c. 26), as continued by the Coin (No. 2) Act 1697 (9 Will. 3. c. 21) and the Assay of Plate Act 1702 (1 Ann. c. 3), perpetual.

Section 2 of the act amended section 9 of the Coin Act 1696 (8 & 9 Will. 3. c. 26) to extend the time limit for any prosecution for offences under that act from 3 to 6 months.

Section 3 of the act made the Bills of Exchange Act 1704 (3 & 4 Ann. c. 8) perpetual.

Section 4 of the act continued the Bankruptcy Act 1705 (4 & 5 Ann. c. 4) and the Bankrupts Act 1706 (6 Ann. c. 22) until the end of the next session of parliament 5 years after 25 April 1709.

== Subsequent developments ==
The Select Committee on Temporary Laws, Expired or Expiring, appointed in 1796, inspected and considered all temporary laws, observing irregularities in the construction of expiring laws continuance acts, making recommendations and emphasising the importance of the Committee for Expired and Expiring Laws.

The whole act was repealed by section 1 of, and the schedule to, the Statute Law Revision Act 1867 (30 & 31 Vict. c. 59), which came into force on 15 July 1867.
