= Security of the Succession, etc. Act 1701 =

Act of the Parliament of England

- Act of Parliament
- Parliament of England
- Long title: An Act for the further Security of His Majesties Person and the Succession of the Crown in the Protestant Line and for extinguishing the Hopes of the pretended Prince of Wales and all other Pretenders and their open and secret Abettors.
- Citation: 13 & 14 Will. 3. c. 6 (Note: This is the citation in The Statutes of the Realm.); 13 Will. 3. c. 6 (Note: This is the citation in The Statutes at Large.)
- Territorial extent: England and Wales

Dates
- Royal assent: 7 March 1702
- Commencement: 30 December 1701 (Note: Start of session.)
- Repealed: 15 July 1867
Other legislation
Amended by	Security of the Succession, etc. Act 1702
Repealed by	Statute Law Revision Act 1867
Relates to	Correspondence with Enemies Act 1691; Correspondence with the Pretender Act 1697; Correspondence with James the Pretender (High Treason) Act 1701; Assay of Plate Act 1702; Treason Act 1708; Security of the Sovereign Act 1714; Treason Act 1743

Status: Repealed

Text of statute as originally enacted

The Security of the Succession, etc. Act 1701 (13 & 14 Will. 3. c. 6) was an act of the Parliament of England. The act required nearly all office-holders to take the oath of abjuration against James Francis Edward Stuart, pretender to the throne, self-styled Prince of Wales and son of the former King James II.

The act also made it high treason to "compass or imagine" the death of Princess Anne of Denmark, the heir apparent to the throne, with effect from 25 March 1702. This clause never came into force however, since Anne became queen on 8 March 1702.

== Assay of Plate Act 1702 ==
Assay of Plate Act 1702
- Act of Parliament
- Parliament of England
- Long title: An Act for continuing an Act made in the Eighth Year of his late Majesty's reign, for better preventing the counterfeiting the current coin of this kingdom.
- Citation: 1 Ann. c. 3; 1 Ann. St. 1. c. 9
- Territorial extent: England and Wales

Dates
- Royal assent: 30 March 1702
- Commencement: 8 March 1702 (Note: Start of session.)
- Repealed: 1 January 1975
Other legislation
Amends	Coin Act 1696
Amended by	Coinage Offences Act 1832; Statute Law (Repeals) Act 1969
Repealed by	Hallmarking Act 1973
Relates to	Security of the Succession, etc. Act 1701

Status: Repealed

Text of statute as originally enacted

Another act, the Assay of Plate Act 1702 (1 Ann. c. 3), passed in 1702, amended the Coin Act 1696 (8 & 9 Will. 3. c. 26), which concerned treason by counterfeiting coins.

=== Provisions ===
Section 1 of the act continued the Coin Act 1696 (8 & 9 Will. 3. c. 26), as continued by the Coin (No. 2) Act 1697 (9 Will. 3. c. 21), until the end of the next session of parliament after 25 March 1709.

== Subsequent developments ==
The whole act was repealed by section 1 of, and the schedule to, the Statute Law Revision Act 1867 (30 & 31 Vict. c. 59), which came into force on 15 July 1867.

== See also ==
- Correspondence with James the Pretender (High Treason) Act 1701
- High treason in the United Kingdom
- Treason Act
