= The Currency of Politics =

2022 intellectual history book by Stefan Eich

The Currency of Politics: The Political Theory of Money from Aristotle to Keynes
- Cover (Note: The book’s cover features the painting “Heart of the Matter” (1963) by Otis Kaye, held by the Art Institute of Chicago. The book also includes a short note on the painting and its relation to the politics of money.)
- Author: Stefan Eich
- Language: English
- Subject: Political theory, history of political thought, monetary theory, monetary history, democratic theory, economic governance, international political economy, intellectual history
- Genre: Non-fiction
- Publisher: Princeton University Press
- Publication date: May 24, 2022 (US), July 19, 2022 (UK)
- Media type: Print (hardcover)
- Pages: 344
- Awards: 2023 Best First Book Prize, Foundations of Political Theory section, American Political Science Association
- ISBN: 9780691191072

The Currency of Politics: The Political Theory of Money from Aristotle to Keynes is a 2022 book by political theorist Stefan Eich, published by Princeton University Press. In the book Eich documents an intellectual history of money and its relationship to democratic politics by investigating key monetary crises from ancient Greece to the contemporary era. The author analyzes the political theories of philosophers including Aristotle, John Locke, Johann Gottlieb Fichte, Karl Marx, and John Maynard Keynes, arguing that money functions not merely as an economic instrument but as a significant institution of political governance. The book was awarded the 2023 Best First Book Prize by the Foundations of Political Theory section of the American Political Science Association. It has been translated into German, Italian, Turkish, and Chinese.

== Overview ==
Eich examines how money has functioned not only as an economic instrument but also as a defining political institution throughout history. In his introduction, he sets out a framework for understanding currency's role in shaping governance and democratic self-rule, and suggested that debates over money's political significance have re-emerged in the aftermath of recent financial crises.

Building on this framework, Eich first engages Aristotle's classical understanding of coinage, showing how the philosopher saw currency as foundational to political communities (Chapter 1). He then traces the modern shift toward “depoliticizing” money through John Locke’s defense of state-backed metallic standards during the Great Recoinage of 1696 (Chapter 2). In contrast, Johann Gottlieb Fichte’s proposal for paper money underscores the idea of currency as a social contract and a tool for civic equality (Chapter 3). This sets the stage for Karl Marx’s critique of money as capital, revealing tensions between monetary politics and the constraints of capitalism (Chapter 4).

Eich next turns to John Maynard Keynes’s approach to “managing modern money,” explaining how Keynes's proposals for both domestic and global monetary governance were shaped by concerns of social justice and democratic oversight (Chapter 5). At the end of the book, the author documents the “silent revolution” in monetary politics after the Bretton Woods system, charting how new forms of global financial governance continue to shape—and are shaped by—democratic aspirations (Chapter 6). An epilogue reflects on what these historical debates teach us about the potential for democratizing money today.

Eich uses these historical case studies to show how currency has repeatedly served as a political tool—subject to philosophical debate and statecraft—rather than merely an inert medium of exchange. His analysis invites readers to see monetary crises and reforms as integral moments in the broader history of governance, showing how the design and control of money remain central to questions of political authority and democratic practice.

== Reviews ==
Writing in the Financial Times, Felix Martin described the book as a "fresh and splendidly clear guide" that investigated the longstanding tensions in monetary policy debates through historical figures such as Aristotle, Locke, Fichte, Marx, and Keynes. Martin particularly appreciated Eich's skill in clarifying complex philosophical disputes and suggested that the book offers crucial insight into why the current Keynesian model of technocratic monetary policy may soon collapse.

Jonathan Levy highlighted Eich's focus on historical debates, particularly contrasting John Locke's rigid view of monetary stability, which Levy described as depoliticizing, with Keynes's more flexible stance advocating monetary systems responsive to democratic pressures.

Carl Wennerlind described Eich's analysis as an insightful critique of economists who have historically "misconstrued money," rendering its political nature invisible or obscured. Wennerlind agreed with the author's argument that money is inherently political and must not be left solely to economists, quoting his assertion that the debate should focus on "how that politics ought to play out and what values should guide it" rather than questioning money's political nature itself. He praised the historical narrative, especially the portrayal of Locke's attempts at depoliticizing money by associating its value strictly with silver, which Eich viewed as a move to "jealously guard money's silver content" to stabilize society. Wennerlind also commended the critique of modern neoliberal monetary policies for creating economic conditions favorable primarily to the wealthy.

British political theorist Duncan Kelly praised the book for its detailed and persuasive historical exploration of money in political thought. Kelly outlined Eich's effectiveness in uncovering the deep historical significance of money as central to thinkers from Aristotle to Keynes. The reviewer said that after Eich's book, "mainstream political theorists no longer have any excuse not to follow the money, wherever it might lead".

Pratap Bhanu Mehta praised the book as "a deep examination of the theoretical and political foundations of money that rescues the money discussion from economists.”

Geoff Mann described the book as an excellent investigation of the “two-sidedness” of money, always “suspended between trust and violence” that haunts the politics and political theory of money. As Mann observes, “ambivalence is not just the subject of Eich’s book, it is also its dominant tone.”

In his review, sociologist Hanno Pahl situated the work within ongoing debates about monetary theory and monetary politics. Pahl praised Eich's historical approach for addressing significant gaps in contemporary political theory by reconnecting the intellectual history of money to political theory debates. Pahl described Eich's analysis as a valuable correction to misunderstandings of monetary theories, notably those of Marx, Aristotle, Locke, Fichte, and Keynes. His reinterpretation of Marx challenged previous scholarly assessments that categorized Marx narrowly as a proponent of commodity-money theories.

Historian Catherine Desbarats praised the rigorous historical methodology and the insightful analyses of canonical thinkers, asserting that these "tightly argued contextual analyses will leave readers with much to reflect upon."

Leonardo Paes Müller, Iderley Colombini and Bruno Höfig reviewed the book and described it as a "masterful" and "ingenious" contribution to understanding monetary crises and innovations through the lens of political thought.

Valerie Schreur characterized Eich's book as an ambitious and insightful contribution to political philosophy and thought it demonstrated money's inherently political nature effectively. Schreur lauded its critical examination of money's perceived neutrality, and acknowledged Eich's thorough intellectual and historical approach but noted some limitations, particularly the unclear linkage between the philosophical discussions presented and the practical realization of democratic self-government.

Historian and political theorist Alan S. Kahan praised Eich for the ambitious scope of his analysis. Kahan appreciated the insightful chapter on Marx and recognized it as "a significant contribution to Marx studies," especially Eich's handling of Marx's puzzling omission of the politics of money in Capital.

Economic historian Adam Tooze described Eich's book as "a milestone in the contemporary debate about money” and “an essential guide to thinking about the politics of money in the midst of the unceasing poly-crisis that engulfs us.”

Political theorist Paul Sagar applauded the historical investigation of political thought on money, praising it as "wonderfully rendered," especially in its treatments of Aristotle, Locke, Fichte, Marx, and Keynes. Sagar admired Eich's ability to connect these thinkers, despite their apparent disparities, stressing in particular "a particularly brilliant chapter about Locke's direct personal engagement in the late-seventeenth-century English recoinage crisis".

== Symposia ==
Three symposia of the book have appeared: European Law Open (in two parts: 2022/2023) [open access], Oxford New Books (June 2024) [open access], The Review of Politics (Winter 2025) [open access].
