= Coin Act 1696 =

Act of the Parliament of England

- Act of Parliament
- Parliament of England
- Long title: An Act for the better preventing the counterfeiting the current Coin of this Kingdom.
- Citation: 8 & 9 Will. 3. c. 26
- Territorial extent: England and Wales; Scotland

Dates
- Royal assent: 16 April 1697
- Commencement: 15 May 1697 (Note: Section 1.)
- Repealed: 1 May 1832
Other legislation
Amends	Coin Act 1694
Amended by	Coin (No. 2) Act 1697; Assay of Plate Act 1702; Treason Act 1708; Perpetuation, etc. of Acts 1708
Repealed by	Coinage Offences Act 1832
Relates to	Coin Act 1572; Coin Act 1575; Coin Act 1732; Counterfeiting Coin Act 1741

Status: Repealed

Text of statute as originally enacted

The Coin Act 1696 (8 & 9 Will. 3. c. 26) was an act of the Parliament of England which made it high treason to make or possess equipment useful for counterfeiting coins. Its title was "An Act for the better preventing the counterfeiting the current Coin of this Kingdom."

== Provisions ==
The act came into effect on 15 May 1697. Section 1 of the act made it treason to "knowingly make or mend, or begin or proceed to make or mend, or assist in the making or mending of" any stamp, mould or the like which could be used to make gold or silver coins current in the realm, or any tool which could be used to emboss letters or marks on the side of a coin. It was also treason to knowingly buy, hide or conceal, or have possession of such items "without lawful Authority or sufficient Excuse for that Purpose." Aiding or abetting such conduct was also treason.

Section 2 of the act made it treason to "wittingly or knowingly convey or assist in the conveying" any of the items described in section 1 out of the Royal Mint without lawful authority. "Knowingly receiving, hiding or concealing the same" without lawful authority was also treason. This section differed from section 1 in that "sufficient Excuse" was not a defence.

Section 3 of the act made it treason to mark the edges of any coin, whether the coin was current or not, or even a counterfeit coin (except if done by a person working in the Royal Mint).

Section 4 of the act made it treason to colour or gild a coin, or anything resembling a coin, so as to make it resemble gold or silver.

Section 5 of the act provided for the destruction of coin-producing machinery found in the possession of anyone not an employee of the Royal Mint.

Section 6 of the act made it a felony to take counterfeit money, or to mix copper with silver. The penalty for this offence was death.

Section 7 of the act stated that corruption of blood was not to apply to any of the offences under this act.

Section 8 of the act provided that trials under the act were to be conducted either in the Court of King's Bench or before the justices of oyer and terminer, the assizes, or the Court of General Gaol Delivery.

Section 9 of the act required any prosecution for offences under the act to begin within three months of the offence. This time limit was later amended to six months for offences under sections 1 and 3 (by the Assay of Plate Act 1702 (1 Ann. c. 3) and by the Perpetuation, etc. of Acts 1708 (7 Ann. c. 25)).

== Subsequent developments ==
The act was continued until the end of the next session of Parliament after 25 March 1701 by section 3 of the Coin (No. 2) Act 1697 (9 Will. 3. c. 21) and until the end of the next session of Parliament after 25 March 1709 by section 1 of the Assay of Plate Act 1702 (1 Ann. c. 3).

The act was extended to cover Scotland by the Treason Act 1708 (7 Ann. c. 21) and made perpetual by Perpetuation, etc. of Acts 1708 (c. 25).

The whole act was repealed by section 1 of the Coinage Offences Act 1832 (2 & 3 Will. 4. c. 34), which came into force on 1 May 1832.

== See also ==
- High treason in the United Kingdom
- Coin Acts 1572 and 1575
- Coin Act 1732
- Counterfeiting Coin Act 1741
- Treason Act
- Great Recoinage of 1696
