= Advowsons Act 1708 =

Act of the Parliament of Great Britain

Advowsons Act 1708 (Note: The citation of this act by this short title was authorised by section 5 of, and the second schedule to, the Statute Law Revision Act 1948. Due to the repeal of those provisions, it is now authorised by section 19(2) of the Interpretation Act 1978.)
- Act of Parliament
- Parliament of Great Britain
- Long title: An Act to preserve the Rights of Patrons to Advowsons. (Note: These words are printed against this act in the second column of the first schedule to the Short Titles Act 1896, which is headed "Title".)
- Citation: 7 Ann. c. 18
- Territorial extent: Great Britain

Dates
- Royal assent: 21 April 1709
- Commencement: 16 November 1708 (Note: Start of session.)
- Repealed: 1 January 1970
Other legislation
Repealed by	Statute Law (Repeals) Act 1969

Status: Repealed

Text of statute as originally enacted

The Advowsons Act 1708 (7 Ann. c. 18) was an act of the Parliament of Great Britain.

Advowson is the right to nominate someone to a bishop to be appointed as minister to a particular church.

== Subsequent developments ==
The whole act was repealed by section 1 of, and part II of the schedule to, the Statute Law (Repeals) Act 1969, which came into force on 1 January 1970.
