= Middlesex Registry Act 1708 =

Act of the Parliament of Great Britain

Middlesex Registry Act 1708 (Note: The citation of this act by this short title was authorised by section 1 of, and the first schedule to, the Short Titles Act 1896. Due to the repeal of those provisions it is now authorised by section 19(2) of the Interpretation Act 1978.)
- Act of Parliament
- Parliament of Great Britain
- Long title: An Act for the Public registring of Deeds Conveyances Wills and other Incumbrances which shall be made of or that may affect any Honors Manors Tenements or Hereditaments within the County of Middlesex after the Twenty-ninth day of September One thousand seven hundred and nine. (Note: These words are printed against this act in the second column of the first schedule to the Short Titles Act 1896, which is headed "Title".)
- Citation: 7 Ann. c. 20
- Territorial extent: Great Britain

Dates
- Royal assent: 21 April 1709
- Commencement: 29 September 1709 (Note: Section 1.)
- Repealed: 30 July 1948

Other legislation
- Repealed by: Criminal Statutes Repeal Act 1861; Statute Law Revision Act 1887; Land Registry (Middlesex Deeds) Act 1891; Statute Law Revision Act 1948
- Relates to: Court of Chancery Act 1842

Status: Repealed

Text of statute as originally enacted

The Middlesex Registry Act 1708 (7 Ann. c. 20) was an act of the Parliament of Great Britain.

== Subsequent developments ==
So much of section 15 as related to any forging or counterfeiting therein mentioned was repealed by section 1 of, and the schedule to, the Criminal Statutes Repeal Act 1861 (24 & 25 Vict. c. 95), which came into force on 1 November 1861.

Section 21 of the act was repealed by section 1 of, and the schedule to, the Statute Law Revision Act 1887 (50 & 51 Vict. c. 59), which came into force on 16 September 1887.

Section 2, from "in the manner following" to the end of the section, and sections 16, 19, 20 and 22 of the act, was repealed by section 7 of, and schedule 2 to, the Land Registry (Middlesex Deeds) Act 1891 (54 & 55 Vict. c. 64).

Sections 3 to 7 and 11 to 14 of the act were repealed by section 7 of, and schedule 2 to, the Land Registry (Middlesex Deeds) Act 1891 (54 & 55 Vict. c. 64).

The whole act, so far as unrepealed, , but without prejudice to any registration, was repealed by section 1 of, and the first schedule to, the Statute Law Revision Act 1948 (11 & 12 Geo. 6. c. 62), which came into force on 30 July 1948.
