= Coin (No. 2) Act 1697 =

Act of the Parliament of England

- Act of Parliament
- Parliament of England
- Long title: An Act for the better preventing the counterfeiting clipping and other Diminishing the Coine of this Kingdome.
- Citation: 9 Will. 3. c. 21 (Note: This is the citation in The Statutes of the Realm.); 9 & 10 Will. 3. c. 21 (Note: This is the citation in The Statutes at Large.)
- Territorial extent: England and Wales

Dates
- Royal assent: 16 May 1698
- Commencement: 3 December 1697 (Note: Start of session.)
- Repealed: 1 May 1832
Other legislation
Amends	Coin Act 1696
Repealed by	Coinage Offences Act 1832
Relates to	Receipt of Exchequer Act 1696

Status: Repealed

Text of statute as originally enacted

The Coin (No. 2) Act 1697 (9 Will. 3. c. 21) was an act of the Parliament of England that strengthened regulations preventing the counterfeiting of coins.

== Background ==
The preamble to the act stated that counterfeit money was still circulating, despite the passing of the Receipt of Exchequer Act 1696 (8 & 9 Will. 3. c. 28).

== Provisions ==
Section 1 of the act provided that any person receiving silver money suspected of being diminished (other than by reasonable wear) or counterfeit could legally cut, break, or deface such coins, with the person tendering counterfeit money bearing the loss, while legitimate coins, even if cut, must still be accepted at their face value.

Section 2 of the act provided that the Tellers of the Receipt of the Exchequer, their Deputies and Clerks, and the Receivers General of every branch of His Majesty's revenue, aids, impositions, duties, and taxes are required to cut, break, or deface every piece of counterfeit or unlawfully diminished silver money tendered in payment to the Crown, and that they must weigh all silver money received to better distinguish counterfeit coins from legitimate ones, with counterfeit or diminished coins not to be received by or allowed to them upon their respective accounts.

Section 3 of the act continued the Coin Act 1696 (8 & 9 Will. 3. c. 26) until the end of the next session of parliament after 25 March 1701.

== Subsequent developments ==
The whole act was repealed by section 1 of the Coinage Offences Act 1832 (2 & 3 Will. 4. c. 34), which came into force on 1 May 1832.
