= Great Recoinage of 1696 =

Attempted reformation of English currency

The Great Recoinage of 1696 was an attempt by the English government under King William III to replace the hammered silver that made up most of the coinage in circulation, much of it being clipped and badly worn.

== History ==
Sterling was in disarray in the late 17th century. Hand-struck silver coins from before 1662 had been clipped around the edges, and thus their value (weight) was reduced so that they were no longer a viable tender, especially abroad. Since the machine-struck silver coins produced by the Royal Mint in the Tower of London after 1662 were protected from clipping by an engraved, decorated and milled edge, they were instead forged, both by casting from counterfeit moulds and by die stamping from counterfeit dies.

By 1696, forged coins constituted approximately 10% of the nation's currency. The currency also had a third problem: its value as silver bullion in Paris and Amsterdam was greater than the face value in London, and thus vast quantities of coins were melted and shipped abroad — an arbitrage market. New acts of Parliament were passed to create the Bank of England and protect national monetary security. The situation caused William Lowndes of the Treasury to ask the warden of the Royal Mint, Isaac Newton, for help.

Branch mints were established at Bristol, Chester, Exeter, Norwich, and York to assist with the work of recoinage. Between 1696 and 1700 the value of silver struck was £5,106,019 (£657 million in 2015) compared to £3,302,193 (£390 million in 2015) coined in the preceding 35 years.

Old coins were returned by weight rather than their face value. On 10 June 1696, a proclamation was issued

… requiring all Receivers and Collectors of the Publick Taxes to take hammer'd Silver Money at five shillings and eight Pence an Ounce.

== Financial results ==
The recoinage was not a financial success. Production tailed off by 1698. It had proved impossible to maintain a system based on gold and silver because of the variation in the bullion value of each metal. In practice, this usually meant that silver was worth more melted down into bullion.

England eventually committed itself to a gold standard. The only way to maintain silver as coin was to reduce the silver content so that the coin's nominal value was more than that of the bullion of the same weight. This did not happen until the Great Recoinage of 1816.

== See also ==
- Coin Act 1696
- Bristol Mint
- Chester Mint
