= List of acts of the Parliament of England from 1697 =

This is a list of acts of the Parliament of England for the year 1697.

For acts passed during the period 1707–1800, see the list of acts of the Parliament of Great Britain. See also the list of acts of the Parliament of Scotland, and the list of acts of the Parliament of Ireland.

For acts passed from 1801 onwards, see the list of acts of the Parliament of the United Kingdom. For acts of the devolved parliaments and assemblies in the United Kingdom, see the list of acts of the Scottish Parliament, the list of acts of the Northern Ireland Assembly, and the list of acts and measures of Senedd Cymru; see also the list of acts of the Parliament of Northern Ireland.

For medieval statutes, etc. that are not considered to be acts of Parliament, see the list of English statutes.

See also the List of ordinances and acts of the Parliament of England, 1642–1660 for ordinances and acts passed by the Long Parliament and other bodies without royal assent, and which were not considered to be valid legislation following the Restoration in 1660.

The number shown after each act's title is its chapter number. Acts are cited using this number, preceded by the years of the reign during which the relevant parliamentary session was held; thus the Union with Ireland Act 1800 is cited as "39 & 40 Geo. 3. c. 67", meaning the 67th act passed during the session that started in the 39th year of the reign of George III and which finished in the 40th year of that reign. The modern convention is to use Arabic numerals in citations (thus "41 Geo. 3" rather than "41 Geo. III"). Acts of the last session of the Parliament of Great Britain and the first session of the Parliament of the United Kingdom are both cited as "41 Geo. 3".

Acts passed by the Parliament of England did not have a short title; however, some of these acts have subsequently been given a short title by acts of the Parliament of the United Kingdom, such as the Short Titles Act 1896 (59 & 60 Vict. c. 14).

Acts passed by the Parliament of England were deemed to have come into effect on the first day of the session in which they were passed. Because of this, the years given in the list below may in fact be the year before a particular act was passed.

== 9 Will. 3 ==
The third session of the 3rd Parliament of William III, which met from 3 December 1697 until 5 July 1698.

Cited as 9 & 10 Will. 3 in Ruffhead's The Statutes at Large. There are some variations in chapter numbering between The Statutes of the Realm and The Statutes at Large. This session was also traditionally cited as 9 & 10 Gul. 3, 9 & 10 W. 3, 9 Gul. 3 or 9 W. 3.

=== Public acts ===
Short title	Citation	Royal assent
Long title
Correspondence with the Pretender Act 1697 (repealed)	9 Will. 3. c. 1 (Note: This is the citation in The Statutes of the Realm.); 9 & 10 Will. 3. c. 1 (Note: This is the citation in The Statutes at Large.)	14 January 1698
An Act against corresponding with the late King James and his Adherents. (Repealed by Statute Law Revision Act 1867 (30 & 31 Vict. c. 59))
Coin Act 1697 (repealed)	9 Will. 3. c. 2; 9 & 10 Will. 3. c. 2	14 January 1698
An Act to prevent the further Currency of any hammered Silver Coine of this Kingdome & for recoining such as is now in being and for the making out new Exchequer Bills where the former Bills are or shall be filled upp by Indorsements. (Repealed by Statute Law Revision Act 1867 (30 & 31 Vict. c. 59))
Bank of England Act 1697 (repealed)	9 Will. 3. c. 3; 9 & 10 Will. 3. c. 3	14 January 1698
An Act to give further time for the administring of Oaths relating to Talleys & Orders and for the easier dispatch of the Publick Businesse in the Exchequer & in the Bank of England. (Repealed by Statute Law Revision Act 1870 (33 & 34 Vict. c. 69))
Imprisonment of Certain Traitors Act 1697 (repealed)	9 Will. 3. c. 4; 9 & 10 Will. 3. c. 4	14 January 1698
An Act for continuing the Imprisonment of Counter and others for the late horrid Conspiracy to assassinate the person of His Sacred Majesty. (Repealed by Statute Law Revision Act 1867 (30 & 31 Vict. c. 59))
Annuities Act 1697 (repealed)	9 Will. 3. c. 5; 9 & 10 Will. 3. c. 5	7 March 1698
An Act for satisfying and discharging the Arreares of several Annuities which incurred betweene the Seventeenth Day of May One thousand six hundred ninety six and the Seventeenth Day of May One thousand six hundred ninety seven. (Repealed by Statute Law Revision Act 1867 (30 & 31 Vict. c. 59))
Sale of Salt Act 1697 (repealed)	9 Will. 3. c. 6; 9 & 10 Will. 3. c. 6	7 March 1698
An Act that all Retailers of Salt shall sell by Weight. (Repealed by Statute Law Revision Act 1867 (30 & 31 Vict. c. 59))
Fireworks Act 1697 (repealed)	9 Will. 3. c. 7; 9 & 10 Will. 3. c. 7	7 March 1698
An Act to prevent the throwing or firing of Squibbs Serpents & other Fire works. (Repealed by Gunpowder Act 1860 (23 & 24 Vict. c. 139))
Taxation Act 1697 (repealed)	9 Will. 3. c. 8; 9 & 10 Will. 3. c. 8	7 March 1698
An Act for explaining an Act made the last Session of Parliament for granting to His Majesty certain Duties upon Malt Mum Sweets Cyder & Perry. (Repealed by Statute Law Revision Act 1867 (30 & 31 Vict. c. 59))
Lace Act 1697 (repealed)	9 Will. 3. c. 9; 9 & 10 Will. 3. c. 9	7 March 1698
An Act for rendring the Laws more effectual for preventing the Importation of Forreign Bone-Lace Loom-Lace Needle-work Point & Cutt-work. (Repealed by Statute Law Revision Act 1867 (30 & 31 Vict. c. 59))
Taxation (No. 2) Act 1697 (repealed)	9 Will. 3. c. 10; 9 & 10 Will. 3. c. 10	2 April 1698
An Act for granting to His Majesty the Summ of One Million foure hundred eighty foure thousand & fifteene Pounds one Shilling eleaven Pence three Farthings for disbanding Forces paying Seamen and other Uses therein mencioned. (Repealed by Statute Law Revision Act 1867 (30 & 31 Vict. c. 59))
Poor Act 1697 (repealed)	9 Will. 3. c. 11; 9 & 10 Will. 3. c. 11	2 April 1698
An Act for explaining an Act made the last Session of Parliament, entituled, "An Act for supplying some Defects in the Laws for the Relief of the Poor of this Kingdome." (Note: Relief of the Poor Act 1696 (8 & 9 Will. 3. c. 30)) (Repealed by Statute Law Revision Act 1867 (30 & 31 Vict. c. 59))
Bridgwater, Somerset (Repair of Bridge and Quay) Act 1697 (repealed)	9 Will. 3. c. 12; 9 & 10 Will. 3. c. 12	2 April 1698
An Act for the inlargeing repaireing and preserving the Bridge & Key of the Borough of Bridgewater in the County of Somersett. (Repealed by Statute Law Revision Act 1948 (11 & 12 Geo. 6. c. 62))
Taxation (Coals and Culm) Act 1697 (repealed)	9 Will. 3. c. 13; 9 & 10 Will. 3. c. 13	16 May 1698
An Act for granting to His Majestie several Duties upon Coals and Culm. (Repealed by Statute Law Revision Act 1867 (30 & 31 Vict. c. 59))
Taxation (Coffee, Tea, Chocolate and Spices) Act 1697 (repealed)	9 Will. 3. c. 14; 9 & 10 Will. 3. c. 14	16 May 1698
An Act for continuing the Duties upon Coffee Tea and Chocolate and Spices towards Satisfaction of the Debt due for Transport Service for the Reduction of Ireland. (Repealed by Statute Law Revision Act 1867 (30 & 31 Vict. c. 59))
Arbitration Act 1697 (repealed)	9 Will. 3. c. 15; 9 & 10 Will. 3. c. 15	16 May 1698
An Act for determining Differences by Arbitration. (Repealed by Arbitration Act 1889 (52 & 53 Vict. c. 49))
Court of Marches of Wales Act 1697 (repealed)	9 Will. 3. c. 16; 9 & 10 Will. 3. c. 16	16 May 1698
An Act to execute Judgements & Decrees saved in a Clause in an Act of the First Yeare of the Reigne of King William and Queen Mary, intituled, "An Act for taking away the Court holden before the President and Council of the Marches of Wales." (Note: Court of Marches of Wales Act 1688 (1 Will. & Mar. c. 27)) (Repealed by Statute Law Revision Act 1867 (30 & 31 Vict. c. 59))
Bills of Exchange Act 1697 (repealed)	9 Will. 3. c. 17; 9 & 10 Will. 3. c. 17	16 May 1698
An Act for the better Payment of Inland Bills of Exchange. (Repealed by Bills of Exchange Act 1882 (45 & 46 Vict. c. 61))
Birdlip and Crickley Hill Road Act 1697 (repealed)	9 Will. 3. c. 18; 9 & 10 Will. 3. c. 18	16 May 1698
An Act for repairing the Highways from the Towne of Birdlipp (Note: The village of Birdlip, Gloucestershire. 51°49′41″N 2°06′38″W) and the Top of Crickley Hill (Note: The location of the former Air Balloon public house, where the A417 meets the A436. 51°50′37″N 2°05′45″W) in the County of Gloucester to the City of Gloucester. (Note: The North Gate of the City of Gloucester, located on Northgate Street, near the junction with St Aldate Street. 51°52′00″N 2°14′39″W) (Repealed by Statute Law (Repeals) Act 2013 (c. 2))
Navigation (Colchester to Wivenhoe) Act 1697 (repealed)	9 Will. 3. c. 19; 9 & 10 Will. 3. c. 19	16 May 1698
An Act for cleansing & making Navigable the Channel from the Hithe att Colchester to Wivenhoe. (Repealed by Colchester and Wivenhoe Navigation and Colchester Improvement Act 1811 (51 Geo. 3. c. xliii))
Naturalization (Persons Born Abroad During the War) Act 1697 (repealed)	9 Will. 3. c. 20; 9 & 10 Will. 3. c. 20	16 May 1698
An Act to naturalize the Children of such Officers and Souldiers & others the natural borne Subjects of this Realme who have been borne abroad during the Warr (Note: The Nine Years' War.) the Parents of such Children haveing been in the Service of this Government. (Repealed by Statute Law Revision Act 1948 (11 & 12 Geo. 6. c. 62))
Coin (No. 2) Act 1697 (repealed)	9 Will. 3. c. 21; 9 & 10 Will. 3. c. 21	16 May 1698
An Act for the better preventing the counterfeiting clipping and other Diminishing the Coine of this Kingdome. (Repealed by Coinage Offences Act 1832 (2 & 3 Will. 4. c. 34))
Malt Act 1697 (repealed)	9 Will. 3. c. 22; 9 & 10 Will. 3. c. 22	16 May 1698
An Act to repeale an Act made in the Nine and thirtieth Yeare of the Reigne of Queen Elizabeth intituled "An Act to restraine the excessive makeing of Malt;" (Note: Malt Act 1597 (39 Eliz. 1. c. 16)) and to discharge & vacate Orders made by Justices of Peace by virtue thereof for restraining Malsters from making Malt. (Repealed by Statute Law Revision Act 1867 (30 & 31 Vict. c. 59))
Civil List Act 1697 (repealed)	9 Will. 3. c. 23; 9 & 10 Will. 3. c. 23	5 July 1698
An Act for granting to His Majesty a further Subsidy of Tunnage and Poundage towards raiseing the Yearly Summ of Seven hundred thousand Pounds for the Service of His Majesties. Household & other Uses therein mencioned during His Majesties Life. (Repealed by Customs Law Repeal Act 1825 (6 Geo. 4. c. 105))
Annuities Act 1697 (repealed)	9 Will. 3. c. 24; 9 & 10 Will. 3. c. 24	5 July 1698
An Act for inlarging the time for purchasing certain Estates or Interests in several Annuities therein mentioned. (Repealed by Statute Law Revision Act 1867 (30 & 31 Vict. c. 59))
Stamps Act 1697 (repealed)	9 Will. 3. c. 25; 9 & 10 Will. 3. c. 25	5 July 1698
An Act for granting to His Majesty His Heires & Successors further Duties upon Stampt Vellum Parchment & Paper. (Repealed by Inland Revenue Repeal Act 1870 (33 & 34 Vict. c. 99))
Trade with Africa Act 1697 (repealed)	9 Will. 3. c. 26; 9 & 10 Will. 3. c. 26	5 July 1698
An Act to settle the Trade to Africa. (Repealed by Statute Law Revision Act 1867 (30 & 31 Vict. c. 59))
Hawkers Act 1697 (repealed)	9 Will. 3. c. 27; 9 & 10 Will. 3. c. 27	5 July 1698
An Act for licensing Hawkers and Pedlars for a further Provision of Interest for the Transport Debt for reduceing of Ireland. (Repealed by Statute Law Revision Act 1871 (34 & 35 Vict. c. 116))
Exportation (Silver) Act 1697 (repealed)	9 Will. 3. c. 28; 9 & 10 Will. 3. c. 28	5 July 1698
An Act for the exporting Watches Sword-hilts and other Manufactures of Silver. (Repealed by Customs Law Repeal Act 1825 (6 Geo. 4. c. 105))
Composition by Debtors (Repeal) Act 1697 (repealed)	9 Will. 3. c. 29; 9 & 10 Will. 3. c. 29	5 July 1698
An Act to repeal the Act made the last Session of Parliament intituled "An Act for Relief of Creditors by making Composition with their Debtors in case Two thirds in Number and Value do agree." (Note: Compositions by Debtors Act 1696 (8 & 9 Will. 3. c. 18)) (Repealed by Statute Law Revision Act 1867 (30 & 31 Vict. c. 59))
Taxation (Lustrings and Alamodes) Act 1697 (repealed)	9 Will. 3. c. 30; 9 & 10 Will. 3. c. 30	5 July 1698
An Act for increasing His Majesties Duties upon Lustrings and Alamodes. (Repealed by Statute Law Revision Act 1867 (30 & 31 Vict. c. 59))
Militia Act 1697 (repealed)	9 Will. 3. c. 31; 9 & 10 Will. 3. c. 31	5 July 1698
An Act for raising the Milita for the Year One thousand six hundred ninety eight although the Months Pay formerly advanced be not paid. (Repealed by Statute Law Revision Act 1867 (30 & 31 Vict. c. 59))
Duties on Marriages etc. Act 1697 (repealed)	9 Will. 3. c. 32; 9 & 10 Will. 3. c. 35	5 July 1698
An Act for preventing Frauds and Abuses in the charging collecting & paying the Duties upon Marriages Births Burials Batchellors and Widowers. (Repealed by Statute Law Revision Act 1871 (34 & 35 Vict. c. 116))
New Forest Act 1697 (repealed)	9 Will. 3. c. 33; 9 & 10 Will. 3. c. 36	5 July 1698
An Act for the increase and preservation of timber in the New Forest in the County of Southampton. (Repealed by Wild Creatures and Forest Laws Act 1971 (c. 47))
Appropriation of Certain Moneys Act 1697 (repealed)	9 Will. 3. c. 34; 9 & 10 Will. 3. c. 37	5 July 1698
An Act for applying to the Use of His Majesties Navy and Ordnance the Overplus of the Money and Stores which were provided for the building Seven and twenty Ships of War. (Repealed by Statute Law Revision Act 1867 (30 & 31 Vict. c. 59))
Blasphemy Act 1697 (repealed)	9 Will. 3. c. 35; 9 & 10 Will. 3. c. 32	5 July 1698
An Act for the more effectual suppressing of Blasphemy and Profaneness. (Repealed by Criminal Law Act 1967 (c. 58))
Coinage Act 1697 (repealed)	9 Will. 3. c. 36; 9 & 10 Will. 3. c. 33	5 July 1698
An Act to stop the coining Farthings and Halfpence for One Year. (Repealed by Statute Law Revision Act 1867 (30 & 31 Vict. c. 59))
Payment of Lottery Tickets Act 1697 (repealed)	9 Will. 3. c. 37; 9 & 10 Will. 3. c. 34	5 July 1698
An Act for the better and more orderly Payment of the Lottery Tickets now payable out of certain additional Duties of Excise and of other Annuities lately payable out of Tunnage Duties. (Repealed by Statute Law Revision Act 1867 (30 & 31 Vict. c. 59))
Poll Tax Act 1697 (repealed)	9 Will. 3. c. 38; 9 & 10 Will. 3. c. 38	5 July 1698
An Act for granting to His Majesty an Aid by a Quarterly Poll for One Year. (Repealed by Statute Law Revision Act 1867 (30 & 31 Vict. c. 59))
Silver and Gold Thread Act 1697 (repealed)	9 Will. 3. c. 39; 9 & 10 Will. 3. c. 39	5 July 1698
An Act for settling and adjusting the Proportion of Fine Silver Silk for the better making of Silver and Gold Thread and to prevent the Abuses of Wire-Drawers. (Repealed by Statute Law Revision Act 1867 (30 & 31 Vict. c. 59))
Exportation Act 1697 (repealed)	9 Will. 3. c. 40; 9 & 10 Will. 3. c. 40	5 July 1698
An Act for the Explanation and better Execution of former Acts made against Transportation of Wool, Fullers Earth, and Scouring Clay. (Repealed by Repeal of Obsolete Statutes Act 1856 (19 & 20 Vict. c. 64))
Embezzlement of Public Stores Act 1697 (repealed)	9 Will. 3. c. 41; 9 & 10 Will. 3. c. 41	5 July 1698
An Act for the better preventing the imbezlement of His Majesties Stores of War and preventing Cheats Frauds and Abuses in paying Seamens Wages. (Repealed by Public Stores Act 1875 (38 & 39 Vict. c. 25))
Registering of Ships Act 1697 (repealed)	9 Will. 3. c. 42; 9 & 10 Will. 3. c. 42	5 July 1698
An Act for enlarging the Time for Registring of Ships pursuant to the Act (Note: Plantation Trade Act 1695 (7 & 8 Will. 3. c. 22)) for preventing Frauds and regulating Abuses in the Plantation Trade. (Repealed by Statute Law Revision Act 1867 (30 & 31 Vict. c. 59))
Lustrings Act 1697 (repealed)	9 Will. 3. c. 43; 9 & 10 Will. 3. c. 43	5 July 1698
An Act for the better Incouragement of the Royal Lustring Company and the more effectual preventing the fraudulent Importation of Lustrings and Alamodes. (Repealed by Statute Law Revision Act 1867 (30 & 31 Vict. c. 59))
East India Company Act 1697 (repealed)	9 Will. 3. c. 44; 9 & 10 Will. 3. c. 44	5 July 1698
An Act for raising a Sum not exceeding Two Millions upon a Fund for Payment of Annuities after the Rate of Eight Pounds per Cent. per Annum; and for settling the Trade to the East Indies. (Repealed by Statute Law Revision Act 1892 (55 & 56 Vict. c. 19))
Taxation (Whale Fins and Scotch Linen) Act 1697 (repealed)	9 Will. 3. c. 45; 9 & 10 Will. 3. c. 45	5 July 1698
An Act for taking away Half the Duties imposed on Glass Wares and the Whole Duties lately laid on Stone and Earthen Wares and Tobacco Pipes and for granting (in lieu thereof) new Duties upon Whale Fins and Scotch Linen. (Repealed by Statute Law Revision Act 1867 (30 & 31 Vict. c. 59))

=== Private acts ===
Short title	Citation	Royal assent
Long title
Vesting in Sydenham Baker a certain rent, messuages and lands in Devon and securing to John and Henry Baker money in lieu of their claims to them.	9 Will. 3. c. 1 Pr.	14 January 1698
An Act for vesting in Sydenham Baker Gentleman an absolute Estate of Inheritance, in Fee Simple, in a certain Rent, Messuages, Lands, and Hereditaments, in the County of Devon; and securing to John Baker Gentleman, and Henry Baker, an Infant, his Son, Monies in Lieu of their Claims thereunto.
Enabling Simon Lord Bishop of Ely and successors to lease Downham manor house and lands and confirming a recent lease thereof by the Bishop and clearing him and others from dilapidations.	9 Will. 3. c. 2 Pr.	7 March 1698
An Act for enabling Symon Lord Bishop of Ely and his Successors to lease the Manor-house and Demesne Lands of Downham, in the Isle of Ely, and for confirming a Lease lately thereof made by the said Bishop; and for the clearing of the said Bishop and others from Dilapidations there.
Sir Francis and Dame Isabella Guybon's Estate Act 1697	9 Will. 3. c. 3 Pr.	7 March 1698
An Act to enable Sir Francis Guybon and Dame Isabella his Wife, and their Trustees, to sell the Manor of Avenalls, and other Lands in or near Gunthorpe, in the County of Norfolke; and for settling other Lands in Lieu thereof.
Naturalization of Gerrard Maesacker and others.	9 Will. 3. c. 4 Pr.	7 March 1698
An Act for the Naturalization of Gerard Maesacker and others.
Enabling Rebecca Lassels to sell copyhold lands and houses in Ealing (Middlesex).	9 Will. 3. c. 5 Pr.	7 March 1698
An Act to enable Rebecca Lassells Widow to sell Copyhold Lands and Houses in Ealing, in the County of Middl'x.
George Farrington's Estate Act 1697	9 Will. 3. c. 6 Pr.	7 March 1698
An Act for vesting in Trustees, to be sold, certain Lands of George Farington Esquire, lying in the Counties of Middl'x and Surrey (settled upon the Marriage of William Farington his Nephew); and, with the Monies arising thereby, for purchasing of other Lands in Lancashire, where the ancient Estate of the Family lies, to be settled to the same Uses.
William Knott's Estate Act 1697	9 Will. 3. c. 7 Pr.	7 March 1698
An Act to enable the Trustees of William Knott Gentleman and his Wife to sell a Lease of Houses in Bread-street, London, for Payment of Debts; and to settle another Estate, of better Value, in Lieu thereof.
Enabling Thomas Kinnersly, an infant, to make a jointure and settlement of his estate.	9 Will. 3. c. 8 Pr.	7 March 1698
An Act to enable Thomas Kynnersly Esquire, an Infant, to make a Jointure and Settlement of his Estate.
Naturalization of Dudley Vesey.	9 Will. 3. c. 9 Pr.	7 March 1698
An Act for naturalizing Dudley Vesey, an Infant.
John Lewin's Estate Act 1697	9 Will. 3. c. 10 Pr.	7 March 1698
An Act to enable John Lewin to sell certain Messuages in Southwarke, for Payment of Debts.
Charles, Earl of Macclesfield's divorce and making illegitimate the children of Anne his wife.	9 Will. 3. c. 11 Pr.	2 April 1698
An Act for dissolving the Marriage between Charles Earl of Maclesfeld and Anne his Wife, and to illegitimate the Children of the said Anne.
Bishopric of Chichester: enabling the Bishop of Chichester to grant leases of property in Chancery Lane.	9 Will. 3. c. 12 Pr.	2 April 1698
An Act to enable John Lord Bishop of Chichester to make Leases of certain Houses and Grounds belonging to the Bishopric of Chichester, situate in Chancery-Lane, for a competent Number of Years.
Naturalization of Charles May.	9 Will. 3. c. 13 Pr.	2 April 1698
An Act to naturalize Charles May Esquire.
Rectification of a mistake in William Gardner's marriage settlement.	9 Will. 3. c. 14 Pr.	2 April 1698
An Act to rectify a Mistake in the Marriage Settlement of William Gardiner Esquire.
Sir Coppleston Bampfylde's Estate Act 1697	9 Will. 3. c. 15 Pr.	2 April 1698
An Act to enable certain Trustees, therein named, to make, renew, and fill up, Leases of the Estate of Sir Copplestone Warwick Bampfyeld and John Bampfyeld his Brother.
John Hall's Estate Act 1697	9 Will. 3. c. 16 Pr.	2 April 1698
An Act for settling the Estate of John Hall, a Lunatic, subject to a Debt charged thereon.
Crediton Workhouse Act 1697 (repealed)	9 Will. 3. c. 17 Pr.	2 April 1698
An Act for erecting Hospitals, Work-houses, and Houses of Correction, within the Town and Parish of Crediton, in the County of Devon; and for the better Relief of the Poor there. (Repealed by Statute Law (Repeals) Act 2013 (c. 2))
Tiverton Workhouse Act 1697 (repealed)	9 Will. 3. c. 18 Pr.	2 April 1698
An Act for erecting Hospitals and Workhouses in the Town and Parish of Tiverton, in the County of Devon, for the better employing and maintaining the Poor thereof. (Repealed by Statute Law (Repeals) Act 2013 (c. 2))
Godolphin's Estate Act 1697	9 Will. 3. c. 19 Pr.	2 April 1698
An Act for confirming and establishing the Administration of the Goods and Chattels of Sir William Godolphin Knight, deceased.
Naturalization of John Francis Fauquire, Joseph Ducasse and others.	9 Will. 3. c. 20 Pr.	2 April 1698
An Act for the Naturalization of John Francis Fauquier, Joseph Du Casse, and others.
Sir Ralph Hare's Estate Act 1697	9 Will. 3. c. 21 Pr.	2 April 1698
An Act for the better enabling Sir Ralph Hare Baronet to make a Jointure, and settle his Estate, and raise Portions and Maintenances for his Younger Children.
George Hewett's Estate Act 1697	9 Will. 3. c. 22 Pr.	2 April 1698
An Act for vesting in Trustees, to be sold, certain Lands of George Hewett Esquire, lying in the County of Middl'x, settled upon his Marriage; and, with the Money arising thereby, for purchasing other Lands in Leicestershire, where his Estate and Seat lies, to be settled to the same Uses.
Wriothesly Baptist late Earl of Gainesborough's estate: sale of lands for payment of debts.	9 Will. 3. c. 23 Pr.	16 May 1698
An Act for vesting Lands in Trustees, to be sold, for Payment of the Debts of Wriothesley Baptist late Earl of Ganesborough, deceased.
Annexing the rectory of Whitbourne (Herefordshire) to the Bishopric of Hereford.	9 Will. 3. c. 24 Pr.	16 May 1698
An Act to annex the Rectory of Whitborne in Herefordshire to the Bishopric of Hereford.
Settling of Viscount and Viscountess Lisburne's estates in Ireland.	9 Will. 3. c. 25 Pr.	16 May 1698
An Act for the better settling the several Estates of the Right Honourable John Lord Viscount Lisburne in the Kingdom of Ireland, and the Lady Viscountess Lisburne his Wife.
Correction of a conveyance concerning Sir Edward and Charles Turner's estate.	9 Will. 3. c. 26 Pr.	16 May 1698
An Act for supplying a Defect in a Conveyance lately made by Sir Edward Turnor and Charles Turnor Esquire, for the more effectual securing the Sum of Twelve Thousand Pounds, and Interest, upon their Estate.
Robert Smith's Estate Act 1697	9 Will. 3. c. 27 Pr.	16 May 1698
An Act for the vesting several Lands late belonging to Robert Smith Esquire, deceased, in Trustees, to be sold, for the Payment of his Debts.
John Houghton's Estate Act 1697	9 Will. 3. c. 28 Pr.	16 May 1698
An Act for vesting the Manors of Bastwick and Laviles, in the County of Norfolke, Part of the Estate of John Houghton Esquire, in Trustees, to be sold, for discharging Debts charged thereon; and for settling another Estate in Lieu thereof.
Enabling Streynsham Master to sell lands in Kent and to convey lands in Derbyshire to the same uses.	9 Will. 3. c. 29 Pr.	16 May 1698
An Act to enable Streynsham Master Esquire to sell Lands in Kent, which were agreed to be settled by his Marriage Articles; and to convey Lands in Derbyshire, of a greater Value, to the same Uses.
Enabling Paris Slaughter, William Druce and Dame Elizabeth Chapman to import several bales of Italian silk.	9 Will. 3. c. 30 Pr.	16 May 1698
An Act to enable Paris Slaughter, William Druce, Merchants, and Dame Elizabeth Chapman, to import several Bales of fine Italian Thrown Silk into this Kingdom.
Settling certain lands in Essex on Thomas Burgh and his heirs in lieu of other lands conveyed by him according to the decree and will of Sir Samuel Jones.	9 Will. 3. c. 31 Pr.	16 May 1698
An Act for settling certain Lands in Essex on Thomas Burgh Esquire and his Heirs, in Lieu of other Lands of greater Value, conveyed by him according to a Decree, and the Will of Sir Samuel Jones deceased.
Thomas Davies Estate Act 1697	9 Will. 3. c. 32 Pr.	16 May 1698
An Act for vesting certain customary Messuages and Lands, within the Manor of Gillingham, in the County of Dorsett, late the Estate of Thomas Davis Gentleman deceased, in Trustees, to be sold, for Payment of Debts.
Exeter Workhouse Act 1697 (repealed)	9 Will. 3. c. 33 Pr.	16 May 1698
An Act for erecting Hospitals and Work-houses within the City and County of the City of Exon, for the better employing and maintaining the Poor there. (Repealed by Statute Law (Repeals) Act 2013 (c. 2))
Hereford Workhouse Act 1697 (repealed)	9 Will. 3. c. 34 Pr.	16 May 1698
An Act for erecting of Hospitals and Workhouses within the City of Hereford, for the better employing and maintaining the Poor there. (Repealed by Statute Law (Repeals) Act 2013 (c. 2))
John Lewin's Estate (Amendment) Act 1697	9 Will. 3. c. 35 Pr.	16 May 1698
An Act to rectify some Mistakes in an Act, intituled, "An Act to enable John Lewin to sell certain Messuages in Southwarke, for Payment of Debts." (Note: John Lewin's Estate Act 1697 (9 Will. 3. c. 10 Pr.))
Nicholas Cary's Estate Act 1697	9 Will. 3. c. 36 Pr.	16 May 1698
An Act for vesting a Moiety of certain Messuages and Lands in Hackney, in the County of Middl'x, in Trustees, for the Benefit of Susan Cary, Widow and Relict of Nicholas Cary Esquire deceased, and others.
Colchester Workhouse Act 1697 (repealed)	9 Will. 3. c. 37 Pr.	16 May 1698
An Act for erecting Hospitals and Work-houses within the Town of Colchester, in the County of Essex, for the better employing and maintaining the Poor thereof. (Repealed by Statute Law (Repeals) Act 2013 (c. 2))
Naturalization of William Lloyd and others.	9 Will. 3. c. 38 Pr.	16 May 1698
An Act to naturalize William Lloyd Esquire and others.
Sir John Churchill's Estate Act 1697	9 Will. 3. c. 39 Pr.	16 May 1698
An Act to confirm the Sale of Part of the Estate of Sir John Churchill Knight deceased, for Payment of his Debts, pursuant to his last Will, and Two Decrees in Chancery for Performance thereof.
Vesting the manor of Alveston and lands in Gloucestershire in trustees to be sold for payment of debts and other purposes.	9 Will. 3. c. 40 Pr.	16 May 1698
An Act for vesting the Manor of Alveston and other Lands therein mentioned, in the County of Gloucester, in Trustees, to be sold, for Payment of Debts, and other Purposes therein mentioned.
Confirmation of a lease granted by Bishop of Winton (Winchester) of a parcel of wasteground in Alverstoke (Hampshire) for constructing and improving waterworks there.	9 Will. 3. c. 41 Pr.	5 July 1698
An Act for confirming a Lease made by the Lord Bishop of Winton, of a Parcel of Waste Ground in Alverstock, in the County of South'ton, for the erecting of Water-works there, and for improving the same.
Sir William Walter's Estate Act 1697	9 Will. 3. c. 42 Pr.	5 July 1698
An Act for securing the Portions intended by Sir William Walter Baronet, deceased, for his Children by the Lady Mary Walter his Second Wife; and for preventing all Doubts which might arise upon the Construction of the Articles and Will therein mentioned.
Relief of Edward Backwell's creditors.	9 Will. 3. c. 43 Pr.	5 July 1698
An Act for Relief of the Creditors of Edward Backwell Esquire, deceased.
Diana Cecill's Estate Act 1697	9 Will. 3. c. 44 Pr.	5 July 1698
An Act for vesting certain Lands and Hereditaments, in Maydstone and elsewhere, in the County of Kent, in Trustees, for the Benefit of Diana Cecill and her Heirs.
Confirmation of conveyance by George Pitt and others of manor of Tarrant Preston and other lands in Dorset to John Pitt.	9 Will. 3. c. 45 Pr.	5 July 1698
An Act to confirm a Conveyance made by George Pitt Esquire and others, of the Manor of Tarrant Preston, and other Lands, in the County of Dorset, to John Pitt Gentleman, and the Heirs Males of his Body.
Newcastle upon Tyne Water Supply Act 1697	9 Will. 3. c. 46 Pr.	5 July 1698
An Act for the better supplying the Town of Newcastle upon Tyne with fresh Water.
Kingston-upon-Hull Workhouse Act 1697 (repealed)	9 Will. 3. c. 47 Pr.	5 July 1698
An Act for erecting Work-houses and Houses of Correction in the Town of Kingston upon Hull, for the Employment and Maintenance of the Poor there. (Repealed by Hull Poor Relief Act 1824 (5 Geo. 4. c. xiii))
Shaftesbury Workhouse Act 1697 (repealed)	9 Will. 3. c. 48 Pr.	5 July 1698
An Act for erecting Work-houses and Houses of Correction in the Town of Shaftesbury, and for the better Employment and Maintenance of the Poor there. (Repealed by Statute Law (Repeals) Act 2013 (c. 2))
Naturalization of Peter Garon and others.	9 Will. 3. c. 49 Pr.	5 July 1698
An Act for naturalizing of Peter Garon and others.
Naturalization of Hillary Reneu and others.	9 Will. 3. c. 50 Pr.	5 July 1698
An Act for naturalizing Hillary Reneu and others.
Freedom of ships "Panther", "Gloucester", "Frigott", "Scarborough" and "Antelope" (formerly prize and condemned) to trade as English built ships.	9 Will. 3. c. 51 Pr.	5 July 1698
An Act, that the Ships Panther, Gloucester Frigott, Scarbrough, and Antelope (formerly taken as Prizes and condemned), may have Freedom of trading as English-built Ships.
Allowing "Maryland Merchant" of Bristol to import her lading.	9 Will. 3. c. 52 Pr.	5 July 1698
An Act for giving Leave to the Ship Maryland Merchant, of Bristoll, to arrive, and import her Lading into this Kingdom.
Freedom of ships "Ruby Prize" and "Plymouth" to trade as English built ships.	9 Will. 3. c. 53 Pr.	5 July 1698
An Act, that the Ships called Ruby Prize and Plymouth may have Freedom of trading as English-built Ships.
Robert Mascall's Estate Act 1697	9 Will. 3. c. 54 Pr.	5 July 1698
An Act for vesting a Coperas Work, (Note: Copperas works manufacture iron(II) sulfate i(green vitriol).) late Part of the Estate of Robert Mascall Esquire deceased, in Trustees, to be sold, for Payment of Debts and other Charges thereupon.
Joseph Smith's Estate Act 1697	9 Will. 3. c. 55 Pr.	5 July 1698
An Act for Sale of Three Houses, in Swan Alley in Coleman Street, London, late of Joseph Smith deceased, for Payment of his Debts, with which the same Houses are chargeable.
John Jenkin's Estate Act 1697	9 Will. 3. c. 56 Pr.	5 July 1698
An Act to enable John Jenkin Merchant to sell Part of his Estate, for Payment of his Debts.
John Hawkes' Estate Act 1697	9 Will. 3. c. 57 Pr.	5 July 1698
An Act to enable John Hawkes Gentleman to sell Lands in the County of Salop, for Payment of his Debts.
Humphrey Walrond's Estate Act 1697	9 Will. 3. c. 58 Pr.	5 July 1698
An Act to enable Humphry Walrond Gentleman to sell Part of his Estate, for the making Provision for his eldest Son and Elizabeth his Daughter (who are Lunatics), and Payment of his Debts, and raising Portions for his other Children.
Freedom of "Sally Rose" (formerly prize) to unload and to trade as an English built ship.	9 Will. 3. c. 59 Pr.	5 July 1698
An Act to give Leave to the Ship Sally Rose (formerly taken as a Prize) to arrive, and import her Lading, and to trade as an English-built Ship.
Vesting in Thomas Rogers the manor of Westcourt and lands in Kent and securing to John Higgens and Alice his wife, and for portions for Irene, Margerett, Mary and Alice Cesar, money in lieu of their claims.	9 Will. 3. c. 60 Pr.	5 July 1698
An Act for vesting in Thomas Rogers Gentleman an absolute Estate of Inheritance, in Fee Simple, in the Manor of West Court, Mansion-house, Messuages, Lands, and Hereditaments, in the County of Kent; and securing to John Higgons Gentleman, Alice his Wife, and for Portions for Irene, Margaret, Mary, and Alice Cesar, Monies in Lieu of their Claims thereunto.
Estates of Sir Edward and Hopton Wyndham Act 1697	9 Will. 3. c. 61 Pr.	5 July 1698
An Act to enable Trustees to make Leases, and grant Copies, and receive the Rents and Profits, of the Estates late of Sir Edward Wyndham Baronet deceased, and Hopton Wyndham Esquire deceased, during the Minority of Sir William Wyndham Baronet, for the Intents and Purposes therein mentioned.
Enabling Humphrey Trafford to raise £4,000 on his estate for payment of debts.	9 Will. 3. c. 62 Pr.	5 July 1698
An Act to enable Humphry Trafford Esquire to raise Four Thousand Pounds upon his Estate, for Payment of his Debts.

=== Sources ===
- Raithby, John, ed. (1963) [1820]. "9° Gul. III.". Statutes of the Realm. Vol. 7: The Statutes of King William III (1695–1701). London: Dawsons. pp. 295–451 – via HathiTrust.
- Raithby, John, ed. (1820). Statutes of the Realm. Vol. 7: 1696-1701 – via British History Online.
- Pickering, Danby, ed. (1764). "Anno nono Gulielmi III". The Statutes at Large. Vol. 10: From the Eighth Year of King William III to the Second Year of Queen Anne. Cambridge: Joseph Bentham. pp. 120–125 – via Internet Archive.
- Pickering, Danby, ed. (1764). "Anno nono & decimo Gulielmi III". The Statutes at Large. Vol. 10: From the Eighth Year of King William III to the Second Year of Queen Anne. Cambridge: Joseph Bentham. pp. 125–234 – via Internet Archive.
- Chronological Table of and Index to the Statutes. Vol. 1: To the End of the Session 59 Vict. Sess. 2 (1895) (13th ed.). London: Her Majesty's Stationery Office. 1896. pp. 79–80 – via Google Books.
- "Chronological Tables of the Private and Personal Acts: Part 5 (1695–1701)". legislation.gov.uk. The National Archives.

== See also ==
- List of acts of the Parliament of England
