= List of acts of the Parliament of England from 1696 =

This is a list of acts of the Parliament of England for the year 1696.

For acts passed during the period 1707–1800, see the list of acts of the Parliament of Great Britain. See also the list of acts of the Parliament of Scotland, and the list of acts of the Parliament of Ireland.

For acts passed from 1801 onwards, see the list of acts of the Parliament of the United Kingdom. For acts of the devolved parliaments and assemblies in the United Kingdom, see the list of acts of the Scottish Parliament, the list of acts of the Northern Ireland Assembly, and the list of acts and measures of Senedd Cymru; see also the list of acts of the Parliament of Northern Ireland.

For medieval statutes, etc. that are not considered to be acts of Parliament, see the list of English statutes.

See also the List of ordinances and acts of the Parliament of England, 1642–1660 for ordinances and acts passed by the Long Parliament and other bodies without royal assent, and which were not considered to be valid legislation following the Restoration in 1660.

The number shown after each act's title is its chapter number. Acts are cited using this number, preceded by the years of the reign during which the relevant parliamentary session was held; thus the Union with Ireland Act 1800 is cited as "39 & 40 Geo. 3. c. 67", meaning the 67th act passed during the session that started in the 39th year of the reign of George III and which finished in the 40th year of that reign. The modern convention is to use Arabic numerals in citations (thus "41 Geo. 3" rather than "41 Geo. III"). Acts of the last session of the Parliament of Great Britain and the first session of the Parliament of the United Kingdom are both cited as "41 Geo. 3".

Acts passed by the Parliament of England did not have a short title; however, some of these acts have subsequently been given a short title by acts of the Parliament of the United Kingdom, such as the Short Titles Act 1896 (59 & 60 Vict. c. 14).

Acts passed by the Parliament of England were deemed to have come into effect on the first day of the session in which they were passed. Because of this, the years given in the list below may in fact be the year before a particular act was passed.

== 8 & 9 Will. 3 ==
The second session of the 3rd Parliament of William III, which met from 20 October 1696 until 16 April 1697.

This session was also traditionally cited as 8 & 9 Gul. 3, 8 & 9 W. 3, 8 Will. 3, 8 Gul. 3 or 8 W. 3.

=== Public acts ===
Short title	Citation	Royal assent
Long title
Coinage Act 1696 (repealed)	8 & 9 Will. 3. c. 1	3 December 1696
An Act for importing and coining Guineas and Halfe-guineas. (Repealed by Statute Law Revision Act 1867 (30 & 31 Vict. c. 59))
Coinage (No. 2) Act 1696 (repealed)	8 & 9 Will. 3. c. 2	3 December 1696
An Act for the further remedying the ill State of the Coin of the Kingdome. (Repealed by Statute Law Revision Act 1867 (30 & 31 Vict. c. 59))
Tallies for Certain Loans Act 1696 (repealed)	8 & 9 Will. 3. c. 3	3 December 1696
An Act to explain that part of the Act passed last Session of Parliament (Note: Taxation, etc. Act 1695 (7 & 8 Will. 3. c. 30)) for laying several Duties on Low Wines & Spirits of the first Extraction and for preventing the Frauds and Abuses of Brewers Distillers and other Persons chargeable with the Duties of Excise which relates to the Payment of Tallies & the Interest thereof. (Repealed by Statute Law Revision Act 1867 (30 & 31 Vict. c. 59))
Attainder of Sir John Fenwick Act 1696 (repealed)	8 & 9 Will. 3. c. 4	11 January 1697
An Act to attaint Sir John Fenwick Baronett of High Treason. (Repealed by Statute Law (Repeals) Act 1977 (c. 18))
Attainder of Conspirators Act 1696 (repealed)	8 & 9 Will. 3. c. 5	11 January 1697
An Act to attaint such of the Persons concerned in the late horrid Conspiracy to assassinate His Majesties Royal Person who are fled from Justice unlesse they render themselves to Justice and for continuing several others of the said Conspirators in Custody. (Repealed by Statute Law (Repeals) Act 1977 (c. 18))
Land Tax Act 1696 (repealed)	8 & 9 Will. 3. c. 6	29 January 1697
An Act for granting an Aid to His Majesty as well by a Land Tax as by several Subsidies and other Duties payable for One Yeare. (Repealed by Statute Law Revision Act 1867 (30 & 31 Vict. c. 59))
Taxation Act 1696 (repealed)	8 & 9 Will. 3. c. 7	8 March 1697
An Act for granting to His Majesty several Duties upon Paper Vellum and Parchment to encourage the bringing of Plate and hammered Money into the Mints to be coined. (Repealed by Statute Law Revision Act 1867 (30 & 31 Vict. c. 59))
Standard of Silver Plate, etc. Act 1696 (repealed)	8 & 9 Will. 3. c. 8	8 March 1697
An Act for Incouraging the bringing in wrought Plate to be coined. (Repealed by Hallmarking Act 1973 (c. 43))
Blackwell Hall Act 1696 (repealed)	8 & 9 Will. 3. c. 9	8 March 1697
An Act to restore the Markett att Blackwell-Hall to the Clothiers & for regulating the Factors there. (Repealed by Statute Law Revision Act 1867 (30 & 31 Vict. c. 59))
Juries Act 1696 (repealed)	8 & 9 Will. 3. c. 10	8 March 1697
An Act to enable the Returns of Juries as formerly until the First Day of November One thousand six hundred ninety seven. (Repealed by Statute Law Revision Act 1867 (30 & 31 Vict. c. 59))
Administration of Justice Act 1696 (repealed)	8 & 9 Will. 3. c. 11	8 March 1697
An Act for the better preventing of frivolous and vexatious Suits. (Repealed by Statute Law Revision Act 1948 (11 & 12 Geo. 6. c. 62))
Taxation (No. 2) Act 1696 (repealed)	8 & 9 Will. 3. c. 12	8 March 1697
An Act for continuing several additional Impositions upon several Goods and Merchandizes. (Repealed by Statute Law Revision Act 1867 (30 & 31 Vict. c. 59))
Mutiny Act 1696 (repealed)	8 & 9 Will. 3. c. 13	1 April 1697
An Act for continuing several former Acts for punishing Officers and Soldiers who shall mutiny or desert His Majesties Service and for punishing false Musters and for Payment of Quarters for One Yeare longer. (Repealed by Statute Law Revision Act 1867 (30 & 31 Vict. c. 59))
Rebuilding of Saint Paul's and Westminster Abbey Act 1696 (repealed)	8 & 9 Will. 3. c. 14	1 April 1697
An Act for the compleating the building and adorning the Cathedral Church of Saint Paul London & for repaireing the Collegiate Church of Saint Peter Westminster. (Repealed by Statute Law (Repeals) Act 2013 (c. 2))
Surrey and Sussex Highways Act 1696 (repealed)	8 & 9 Will. 3. c. 15	1 April 1697
An Act for repairing the High-way betweene Ryegate in the County of Surrey & Crawley in the County of Sussex. (Repealed by Statute Law (Repeals) Act 2013 (c. 2))
Highways Act 1696 (repealed)	8 & 9 Will. 3. c. 16	1 April 1697
An Act for enlargeing Common High-ways. (Repealed by Highways (No. 2) Act 1766 (7 Geo. 3. c. 42))
Paving the Haymarket Act 1696 (repealed)	8 & 9 Will. 3. c. 17	1 April 1697
An Act for paving and regulating the Hay-Markett in the parish of Saint Martin in the Fields and Saint James within the Liberty of Westminster. (Repealed by Markets in Saint Pancras Parish, Middlesex Act 1830 (11 Geo. 4. & 1 Will. 4. c. 14))
Compositions by Debtors Act 1696 (repealed)	8 & 9 Will. 3. c. 18	1 April 1697
An Act for Relief of Creditors by making Composition with their Debtors in Case Two Thirds in Number & Value doe agree. (Repealed by Composition by Debtors (Repeal) Act 1697 (9 Will. 3. c. 29))
Excise Act 1696 (repealed)	8 & 9 Will. 3. c. 19	1 April 1697
An Act for repealing a Clause in a former Act relateing to Party Guiles and for the better preventing Frauds and Abuses in Brewers and others chargeable with the Duties of Excise. (Repealed by Statute Law Revision Act 1867 (30 & 31 Vict. c. 59))
Bank of England Act 1696 (repealed)	8 & 9 Will. 3. c. 20	1 April 1697
An Act for making good the Deficiencies of several Funds therein mentioned and for enlargeing the Capital Stock of the Bank of England and for raising the Publick Creditt. (Repealed by Statute Law (Repeals) Act 1973 (c. 39))
Taxation (No. 3) Act 1696 (repealed)	8 & 9 Will. 3. c. 21	16 April 1697
An Act for laying a Duty upon Leather for the Terme of Three Yeares, and making other Provision for answering the Deficiences as well of the late Duties upon Coals & Culme, as for paying the Annuities upon the Lottery and for Lives, charged on the Tunage of Ships and the Duties upon Salt. (Repealed by Statute Law Revision Act 1867 (30 & 31 Vict. c. 59))
Taxation (No. 4) Act 1696 (repealed)	8 & 9 Will. 3. c. 22	16 April 1697
An Act for granting to His Majesty certain Duties upon Malt, Mum, Sweets, Cyder, & Perry as well towards carrying on the Warr against France, (Note: The Nine Years' War.) as for the necessary Occasions of His Majesties Household, & other Occasions. (Repealed by Statute Law Revision Act 1867 (30 & 31 Vict. c. 59))
Greenwich Hospital, etc. Act 1696 (repealed)	8 & 9 Will. 3. c. 23	16 April 1697
An Act to enforce the Act for the Encrease and Encouragement of Seamen. (Repealed by Greenwich Hospital Act 1834 (4 & 5 Will. 4. c. 34))
Taxation (No. 4) Act 1696 (repealed)	8 & 9 Will. 3. c. 24	16 April 1697
An Act for granting to His Majesty a further Subsidy of Tunnage and Poundage upon Merchandizes imported for the Terme of Two Yeares & Three Quarters & an additional Land Tax for One Yeare for carrying on the Warr against France. (Repealed by Statute Law Revision Act 1867 (30 & 31 Vict. c. 59))
Taxation (No. 6) Act 1696 (repealed)	8 & 9 Will. 3. c. 25	16 April 1697
An Act for licensing Hawkers and Pedlars for a further provision for the Payment of the Interest of the Transport Debt for the reducing of Ireland. (Repealed by Statute Law Revision Act 1867 (30 & 31 Vict. c. 59))
Coin Act 1696 (repealed)	8 & 9 Will. 3. c. 26	16 April 1697
An Act for the better preventing the counterfeiting the current Coin of this Kingdom. (Repealed by Coinage Offences Act 1832 (2 & 3 Will. 4. c. 34))
Escape of Debtors, etc. Act 1696 or the Escape from Prison Act 1697 (repealed)	8 & 9 Will. 3. c. 27	16 April 1697
An Act for the more effectual Relief of Creditors in Cases of Escapes & for Preventing Abuses in Prisons and pretended priveledged Places. (Repealed by Statute Law Revision Act 1867 (30 & 31 Vict. c. 59), Statute Law Revision Act 1887 (50 & 51 Vict. c. 59), Public Authorities Protection Act 1893 (56 & 57 Vict. c. 61) and Statute Law Revision Act 1948 (11 & 12 Geo. 6. c. 62))
Receipt of Exchequer Act 1696 (repealed)	8 & 9 Will. 3. c. 28	16 April 1697
An Act for the better Observation of the Course anciently used in the Receipt of Exchequer. (Repealed by Office of Receipt of Exchequer Act 1834 (4 & 5 Will. 4. c. 15))
Bridlington Piers Act 1696 (repealed)	8 & 9 Will. 3. c. 29	16 April 1697
An Act for the Repaire of the Peers of Bridlington alias Burlington in the East-Riding of the County of York. (Repealed by Bridlington Piers and Harbour Act 1837 (7 Will. 4 & 1 Vict. c. cx))
Relief of the Poor Act 1696 (repealed)	8 & 9 Will. 3. c. 30	16 April 1697
An Act for supplying some Defects in the Laws for the Relief of the Poor of this Kingdome. (Repealed by Poor Law Act 1927 (17 & 18 Geo. 5. c. 14))
Partition Act 1696 (repealed)	8 & 9 Will. 3. c. 31	16 April 1697
An Act for the easier obtaining Partitions of Lands in Coparcenary, Joynt-Tenancy, & Tenancy in Common. (Repealed by Statute Law Revision Act 1867 (30 & 31 Vict. c. 59))
Brokers Act 1696 (repealed)	8 & 9 Will. 3. c. 32	16 April 1697
An Act to restraine the Number and ill Practice of Brokers and Stock-Jobbers. (Repealed by Statute Law Revision Act 1867 (30 & 31 Vict. c. 59))
Quarter Sessions Act 1696 (repealed)	8 & 9 Will. 3. c. 33	16 April 1697
An Act to make perpetual and more effectual an Act, intituled, "An Act to prevent Delays att the Quarter Sessions of the Peace." (Note: Quarter Sessions Delays Act 1694 (5 & 6 Will. & Mar. c. 11)). (Repealed by Statute Law (Repeals) Act 1977 (c. 18))
Duty on Tin Act 1696 (repealed)	8 & 9 Will. 3. c. 34	16 April 1697
An Act for the lessening the Duty upon Tin and Pewter exported and granting an Equivalent for the same by a Duty upon Druggs. (Repealed by Statute Law Revision Act 1867 (30 & 31 Vict. c. 59))
Militia Act 1696 (repealed)	8 & 9 Will. 3. c. 35	16 April 1697
An Act for raiseing the Militia for the Yeare One thousand six hundred ninety seven although the Months Pay formerly advanced be not repaid. (Repealed by Statute Law Revision Act 1867 (30 & 31 Vict. c. 59))
Lustrings Act 1696 (repealed)	8 & 9 Will. 3. c. 36	16 April 1697
An Act for the further Encouragement of the Manufacture of Lustrings and Alamodes within this Realme and for the better preventing the Importation of the same. (Repealed by Statute Law Revision Act 1867 (30 & 31 Vict. c. 59))
Streets (London) Act 1696 (repealed)	8 & 9 Will. 3. c. 37	16 April 1697
An Act for explaining and enforcing the Act (Note: London Streets, etc. Act 1690 (2 Will. & Mar. Sess. 2. c. 8)) for paving and cleansing the Streets within the Cities of London and Westminster and Borough of Southwark & weekly Bills of Mortality and Streets adjoyning thereunto & for widening the Street at the South end of London-Bridge. (Repealed by Statute Law (Repeals) Act 1989 (c. 43) and Statute Law (Repeals) Act 2013 (c. 2))

=== Private acts ===
Short title	Citation	Royal assent
Long title
Naturalization of Lord Agram and others.	8 & 9 Will. 3. c. 1 Pr.	11 January 1697
An Act for naturalizing Frederick Christiean de Rhede, commonly called Lord Aghram, and others.
Crompton Mynors' Estate Act 1696	8 & 9 Will. 3. c. 2 Pr.	11 January 1697
An Act for the Settlement of the Manor of Treyagoe, in the County of Hereford, and other the Lands late of Crompton Mynors Esquire deceased; and for raising and increasing of the Portion of Theodosia Mynors, the Daughter of the said Crompton, the being an Infant of the Age of Seventeen Years.
Sir John Hotham's Estate Act 1696	8 & 9 Will. 3. c. 3 Pr.	29 January 1697
An Act for vesting the Manors of Holme, alias East Holme, and Swannage, in the County of Dorsett, Part of the Estate of Sir John Hanham Baronet, in Trustees, to be sold, for discharging a Mortgage thereupon, and upon the Residue of the said Sir John Hanham's Estate, and for Payment of his other Debts.
Oliver Neve's Estate Act 1696	8 & 9 Will. 3. c. 4 Pr.	29 January 1697
An Act for enabling Oliver Neve, of Great Witchingham, in the County of Norfolke, Esquire, to sell Two Houses in London; and for vesting other Lands in the said County, of greater Value, to the same Uses.
Enabling James Duke of Ormond to raise money by sale of woods and to make leases for lives for payment of debts, encouraging English plantation in Ireland and enabling Charles Earl of Arran to make leases of his estate in Ireland.	8 & 9 Will. 3. c. 5 Pr.	8 March 1697
An Act for enabling James Duke of Ormond to raise Money, by Sale of Woods, and making Leases for Lives renewable for ever, for Payment of Debts, and for encouraging English Plantation in Ireland; and for Charles Lord Weston, Earl of Arran in the Kingdom of Ireland, to make Leases of his Estate in the said Kingdom.
Bishop of London and Earl of Nottingham advowsons exchange.	8 & 9 Will. 3. c. 6 Pr.	8 March 1697
An Act for the Exchange of certain Advowsons between the Bishop of London and the Earl of Nottingham.
For satisfying debts of Francis late Lord Holles.	8 & 9 Will. 3. c. 7 Pr.	8 March 1697
An Act for the speedy satisfying the Debts of Francis late Lord Holles, deceased.
Enabling Sir Ralph Ashton to rectify an omission in his marriage settlement.	8 & 9 Will. 3. c. 8 Pr.	8 March 1697
An Act to enable Sir Ralph Ashton Baronet to supply an Omission of a Limitation intended in his Marriage Settlement, for the Benefit of his Issue Male.
Francis Griffith's Estate Act 1696	8 & 9 Will. 3. c. 9 Pr.	8 March 1697
An Act for Sale of the Estate of Francis Griffith, late of London, Scrivener, deceased, for Payment of his Debts.
Mary Savile's Estate Act 1696	8 & 9 Will. 3. c. 10 Pr.	8 March 1697
An Act for settling the Estate of Mary Savill, an Infant, upon her Marriage.
Jeffery Stockley's Estate Act 1696	8 & 9 Will. 3. c. 11 Pr.	8 March 1697
An Act to enable the Sale of Lands, late of Jeffrey Stockley, in the County of Chester, deceased, for Payment of his Debts, and for making Provision for Mary his Daughter.
Charles Milson's Estate Act 1696	8 & 9 Will. 3. c. 12 Pr.	8 March 1697
An Act for vesting certain Messuages, Lands, and Tenements, late of Charles Milson deceased, in Trustees, to sell, for Payment of Debts and Legacies; and lay out the Surplus-money in a Purchase of Lands for the Use of Edward Milson and his Heirs, according to the Will of the said Charles Milson.
Enabling Nicholas Goodwin the elder and the younger to sell the manor of Winslow (Buckinghamshire) and to purchase other lands to be settled to the same uses.	8 & 9 Will. 3. c. 13 Pr.	8 March 1697
An Act to enable Nicholas Goodwin the Elder and Nicholas Goodwin the Younger to sell the Manor of Winslow, in the County of Bucks; and, with the Money arising thereby, and other Monies to be advanced by the said Nicholas Goodwin the Elder, to purchase Lands of a greater Yearly Value, to be settled to the same Uses as the said Manor is now settled.
William Melward's Estate Act 1696	8 & 9 Will. 3. c. 14 Pr.	8 March 1697
An Act for the vesting of certain Lands of William Milward, in the County of Hereford, Clerk, in Trustees, for Payment of Debts.
Edward Kerrey's Estate Act 1696	8 & 9 Will. 3. c. 15 Pr.	8 March 1697
An Act for vesting the Estate of Edward Kerry Esquire, lying in Binweston, in the County of Salop, in Trustees, to discharge Incumbrances thereon, and to raise Portions for Younger Children; and for confirming the Marriage Settlement of the said Edward Kerry.
Thomas Panton's Estate Act 1696	8 & 9 Will. 3. c. 16 Pr.	8 March 1697
An Act for vesting Part of the Estate of Thomas Panton Esquire in Trustees, to be sold, for Payment of Debts, and securing a Jointure to Mary his Wife.
Naturalization of John Keyser and others.	8 & 9 Will. 3. c. 17 Pr.	8 March 1697
An Act for naturalizing of John Keyser and others.
Edward and Mary (his wife) Leigh's estate: sale of manors of Waxham and Horsey and lands in Norfolk and purchase of others.	8 & 9 Will. 3. c. 18 Pr.	8 March 1697
An Act to enable Edward Leigh Esquire and Jane his Wife, and their Trustees, to sell the Manors of Waxham and Horsey, and certain Lands and Tenements in the County of Norfolke; and to purchase and settle other Lands to the same Uses.
William James' Estate Act 1696	8 & 9 Will. 3. c. 19 Pr.	8 March 1697
An Act for vesting and settling certain Estates of William James Gentleman in and upon Trustees, to be sold, for the Payment of Debts, and making Provision for himself, his Wife, and their Children.
Importing goods and merchandise laden in Turkey in ships called "Success" and "Dragon Galley" paying customs as if imported by English ships.	8 & 9 Will. 3. c. 20 Pr.	1 April 1697
An Act for importing several Goods and Merchandizes laden in Turkey on board the Ship called The Success, and Dragon Galley, paying Customs as if imported by English Ships.
William Fallows' Estate Act 1696	8 & 9 Will. 3. c. 21 Pr.	1 April 1697
An Act to enable William Fallows, an Infant, to sell an Estate in the County of Chester, to pay Debts secured by Mortgages.
Oliver Neve's Estate (Amendment) Act 1696	8 & 9 Will. 3. c. 22 Pr.	1 April 1697
An Act to supply a Defect in an Act for enabling Oliver Neve Esquire to sell Two Houses in London; (Note: Oliver Neve's Estate Act 1696 (8 & 9 Will. 3. c. 4 Pr.)) and for settling Lands in the County of Norfolke, of greater Value, to the same Uses.
Edmond Warner's Estate Act 1696	8 & 9 Will. 3. c. 23 Pr.	1 April 1697
An Act for explaining a former Act, intituled, "An Act for enabling Trustees to sell Part of the Estate of Edmond Warner deceased, for Payment of his Debts, and for preserving the rest for the Benefit of his Heir." (Note: Edmond Warner's Estate Act 1695 (7 & 8 Will. 3. c. 11 Pr.))
Roger Crowle's Estate Act 1696	8 & 9 Will. 3. c. 24 Pr.	1 April 1697
An Act for vesting Part of the Estate of Roger Crowle Esquire, deceased, in Trustees, for raising Portions for his Younger Children, in regard he (being a Lunatic) could not execute a Power in his Marriage Settlement for that Purpose.
Samuel Trotman's Estate Act 1696	8 & 9 Will. 3. c. 25 Pr.	1 April 1697
An Act to vest certain Lands, late of Samuel Trotman Esquire deceased, lying in Barking, Eastham, Westham, and Woolwich, in the Counties of Kent and Essex, in Trustees, to be sold; and to settle other Lands in Lieu thereof.
Speedy payment of the late Sir William Thompson's debts.	8 & 9 Will. 3. c. 26 Pr.	16 April 1697
An Act for the speedy Payment of the Debts of Sir William Thompson Knight, Serjeant at Law, deceased.
Annulment of Hannah Knight's (an infant) marriage settlement and directing her guardianship.	8 & 9 Will. 3. c. 27 Pr.	16 April 1697
An Act for annulling the Marriage of Hannah Knight an Infant, and directing the Guardianship of the said Infant.
William Hamond's marriage settlement: power to sell the manor of Rowling (Kent) comprised in the settlement by mistake.	8 & 9 Will. 3. c. 28 Pr.	16 April 1697
An Act for enabling the Sale of the Manor of Rowling in Kent, which, by Mistake, was by general Words comprised in the Marriage Settlement of William Hammond Gentleman; contrary to the Meaning of the Parties.

=== Sources ===
- Raithby, John, ed. (1963) [1820]. "8° & 9° Gul. III.". Statutes of the Realm. Vol. 7: The Statutes of King William III (1695–1701). London: Dawsons. pp. 161–294 – via HathiTrust.
- Raithby, John, ed. (1820). Statutes of the Realm. Vol. 7: 1696-1701 – via British History Online.
- Pickering, Danby, ed. (1764). "Anno octavo & nono Gulielmi III". The Statutes at Large. Vol. 10: From the Eighth Year of King William III to the Second Year of Queen Anne. Cambridge: Joseph Bentham. pp. 1–120 – via Internet Archive.
- Chronological Table of and Index to the Statutes. Vol. 1: To the End of the Session 59 Vict. Sess. 2 (1895) (13th ed.). London: Her Majesty's Stationery Office. 1896. pp. 78–79 – via Google Books.
- "Chronological Tables of the Private and Personal Acts: Part 5 (1695–1701)". legislation.gov.uk. The National Archives.

== See also ==
- List of acts of the Parliament of England
