= Statute Law Revision Act 1867 =

Act of the Parliament of the United Kingdom

Statute Law Revision Act 1867 (Note: Section 2.)
- Act of Parliament
- Parliament of the United Kingdom
- Long title: An Act for further promoting the Revision of the Statute Law by repealing certain Enactments which have ceased to be in force or have become unnecessary.
- Citation: 30 & 31 Vict. c. 59
- Introduced by: Frederic Thesiger, 1st Baron Chelmsford (Lords)
- Territorial extent: United Kingdom

Dates
- Royal assent: 15 July 1867
- Commencement: 15 July 1867 (Note: The Acts of Parliament (Commencement) Act 1793.)
Other legislation
Amends	See § Repealed enactments
Repeals/revokes	See § Repealed enactments
Amended by	Statute Law Revision Act 1893; Statute Law Revision (Isle of Man) Act 1991
Relates to	Repeal of Obsolete Statutes Act 1856; See Statute Law Revision Act

Status: Partially repealed

History of passage through Parliament

Records of Parliamentary debate relating to the statute from Hansard

Text of statute as originally enacted

The Statute Law Revision Act 1867 (30 & 31 Vict. c. 59) is an act of the Parliament of the United Kingdom that repealed for the United Kingdom enactments from 1688 to 1770 which had ceased to be in force or had become unnecessary. The act was intended, in particular, to facilitate the preparation of a revised edition of the statutes.

As of 2026, the act remains partly in force in the United Kingdom.

== Background ==
In the United Kingdom, acts of Parliament remain in force until expressly repealed. Blackstone's Commentaries on the Laws of England, published in the late 18th-century, raised questions about the system and structure of the common law and the poor drafting and disorder of the existing statute book.

From 1810 to 1825, The Statutes of the Realm was published, providing the first authoritative collection of acts. The first statute law revision act was not passed until 1856 with the Repeal of Obsolete Statutes Act 1856 (19 & 20 Vict. c. 64). This approach — focusing on removing obsolete laws from the statute book followed by consolidation — was proposed by Peter Locke King MP, who had been highly critical of previous commissions' approaches, expenditures, and lack of results.

Previous statute law revision acts
Year passed	Title	Citation	Effect
1861	Statute Law Revision Act 1861	24 & 25 Vict. c. 101	Repealed or amended over 800 enactments
1863	Statute Law Revision Act 1863	26 & 27 Vict. c. 125	Repealed or amended over 1,600 enactments for England and Wales

== Passage ==
The Statute Law Revision Bill had its first reading in the House of Lords on 21 May 1867, introduced by the Lord Chancellor, Frederic Thesiger, 1st Baron Chelmsford. The bill had its second reading in the House of Lords on 28 May 1867 and was committed to a committee of the whole house. In his speech in support of the bill, the Lord Chancellor explained that the bill aimed at filling the gap between the Statute Law Revision Act 1861 (24 & 25 Vict. c. 101) and the Statute Law Revision Act 1863 (26 & 27 Vict. c. 125), which had covered 10 Geo. 3 to 21 & 22 Vict. and the Magna Carta to the end of the Reign of James II respectively. On the passing of the act, the revised edition of the statutes would be six or seven volumes, instead of the eighty-five or eighty-six before (when including repeals by the 1861 and 1863 acts). The Committee met and reported on 31 May 1867, without amendments. The bill had its third reading in the House of Lords on 3 June 1867 and passed, without amendments.

The bill had its first reading in the House of Commons on 6 June 1867, second reading in the House of Commons on 13 June 1867 and was referred to a committee of the whole house, which met and reported on 24 June 1867, without amendments. The bill had its third reading in the House of Commons on 1 July 1867 and passed, without amendments.

The bill was granted royal assent on 15 July 1867.

== Subsequent developments ==
The act was intended, in particular, to facilitate the preparation of a revised edition of the statutes.

The enactments which were repealed (whether for the whole or any part of the United Kingdom) by the act were repealed so far as they extended to the Isle of Man by section 1(1) of, and schedule 1 to, the Statute Law Revision (Isle of Man) Act 1991, which came into force on 25 July 1991.

The act was retained for the Republic of Ireland by section 2(2)(a) of, and part 4 of schedule 1 to, the Statute Law Revision Act 2007, which came into force on 8 May 2007.

The schedule to the act was repealed by section 1 of, and the schedule to, the Statute Law Revision Act 1893 (56 & 57 Vict. c. 14), which came into force on 9 June 1893.

== Repealed enactments ==
Section 1 of the act repealed 1,386 enactments, listed in the schedule to the act, across six categories: (Note: The Note of the bill, unlike the schedule, gives commentary on each act, noting any earlier repeals and the reason for the new repeal.)

- Expired
- Spent
- Repealed in general terms
- Virtually repealed
- Superseded
- Obsolete

Section 1 of the act included several safeguards to ensure that the repeal does not negatively affect existing rights or ongoing legal matters. Specifically, any legal rights, privileges, or remedies already obtained under the repealed laws, as well as any legal proceedings or principles established by them, remain unaffected. Section 1 of the act also ensured that repealed enactments that have been incorporated into other laws would continue to have legal effect in those contexts. Moreover, the repeal would not revive any former rights, offices, or jurisdictions that had already been abolished.

== See also ==
- Statute Law Revision Act
