= Coin Act =

Coin Act may refer to

- Coin Act 1696, Act of the Parliament of England
- Coin Act 1732, Act of the Parliament of Great Britain
- Coin Act 1816, Act of the Parliament of the United Kingdom
