= Counterfeiting Coin Act 1741 =

Act of the Parliament of Great Britain

- Act of Parliament
- Parliament of Great Britain
- Long title: An act for the more effectual preventing the counterfeiting of the current coin of this kingdom, and the uttering or paying of false or counterfeit coin.
- Citation: 15 Geo. 2. c. 28
- Territorial extent: Great Britain

Dates
- Royal assent: 15 July 1742
- Commencement: 29 September 1742 (Note: Section 1.)
- Repealed: 1 May 1832
Other legislation
Amended by	Counterfeiting Coin Act 1797
Repealed by	Coinage Offences Act 1832
Relates to	Coin Act 1572; Coin Act 1575; Coin Act 1696; Coin Act 1732; Counterfeiting of Copper Coin Act 1771

Status: Repealed

Text of statute as originally enacted

The Counterfeiting Coin Act 1741 (15 Geo. 2 c. 28) was an act of the Parliament of Great Britain which made it high treason to counterfeit silver, copper or brass coins, where previously the crime of counterfeiting such coins had been a misdemeanour. Its long title was An act for the more effectual preventing the counterfeiting of the current coin of this kingdom, and the uttering or paying of false or counterfeit coin. It has since been repealed, although it created a precedent that recidivism could result in higher penalties for additional crimes by the same defendant.

== Background ==
Section 2 of the act began with an explanation for why the act was necessary:

...and whereas the uttering of false money, knowing it to be false, is a crime frequently committed all over the kingdom, and the offenders therein are not deterred, by reason that it is only a misdemeanour, and the punishment very often is but small, though there be great reason to believe that the common utterers of such false money are either themselves the coiners, or in confederacy with the coiners thereof...

== Application ==
The act included a provision that penalties were enhanced for recidivism, meaning a second or subsequent violation of uttering would receive greater punishment.

The act was possibly not applicable to Scotland, although it was culpable.

== Provisions ==
=== Offences ===
Sections 1, 2, 6, 7 and 8 of the act came into force on 29 September 1742.

Section 1 made it high treason to "wash, gild or colour any of the lawful silver coin called a shilling or a sixpence, or counterfeit or false shilling or sixpence," or alter such a coin to make it look like a "lawful gold coin called a guinea" or half-guinea, or to file, alter, wash or colour "any of the brass monies called halfpennies or farthings, or to make those coins look like a shilling or sixpence. The last part of this section was amended by the Counterfeiting Coin Act 1797 to extend it to all copper coins ordered by royal proclamation to be current in the realm, not just halfpennies and farthings.

Following the words quoted above, section 2 continued to impose a mandatory minimum sentence of six months' imprisonment for uttering a false coin, knowing it to be false. On release the offender then had to provide sureties to be of good behaviour for another six months. For a second offence, the punishment was two years' imprisonment followed by another two years of good behaviour under surety. A third offence was a felony, punishable with death by hanging.

Section 3 provided that a person who committed an offence under section 2 and then committed the same offence again within 10 days, or was found in possession of more counterfeit money within 10 days was to be deemed "a common utterer of false money" and sentenced to one year imprisonment and then provide sureties for his good behaviour for another two years. If a person convicted of this offence ever uttered or tendered false coin in payment again, he was guilty of felony without benefit of clergy.

Section 6 made it a crime to "make, coin or counterfeit any brass or copper money, commonly called a halfpenny or a farthing," to be punished with two years' imprisonment followed by providing sureties for another two years' good behaviour.

=== Other matters ===
Section 4 provided that there was to be no corruption of blood for offences under the act.

Section 5 stated that the same rules of procedure and evidence which applied to already existing crimes of counterfeiting coins were to apply to crimes under the act, except that a time limit of 6 months applied to starting a prosecution for treason or felony under the act.

Section 7 stated that anyone who apprehended someone for treason or felony against the act, or for an offence under section 6, was to be given a reward for each person convicted: 40 pounds for each traitor or felon, and 10 pounds for each person offending against section 6. The reward was to be paid by the sheriff of the county within one month of the conviction. If the sheriff failed to pay then he was to forfeit double the reward money, plus treble the costs of suing him, which would all be paid to the informer.

Section 8 said that anyone who committed an offence against the act but who then provided information leading to the conviction of two or more other offenders was to be pardoned.

Generally speaking, the rules of evidence and jurisdiction in the 18th century were that what happened in one county could not be proved in a court in a different county. However section 9 permitted a previous conviction under the act in one county to be proved in a court in another county by a certificate signed by the court clerk.

Section 10 increased the fund for prosecuting counterfeiters from £400 to £600 per annum. (This fund had been set up by the Coinage Act 1708 (7 Ann. c. 24), section 4, in 1708.)

== Extension of the act ==
In 1797 the provisions of the act which applied to halfpennies and farthings were extended to all copper coins by the Counterfeiting Coin Act 1797 (37 Geo. 3. c. 126).

== See also ==
- High treason in the United Kingdom
- Coin Acts 1572 and 1575
- Coin Act 1696
- Coin Act 1732
- Treason Act
