= Whitney-on-Wye toll bridge =

Bridge in Herefordshire, England

Whitney-on-Wye Toll Bridge
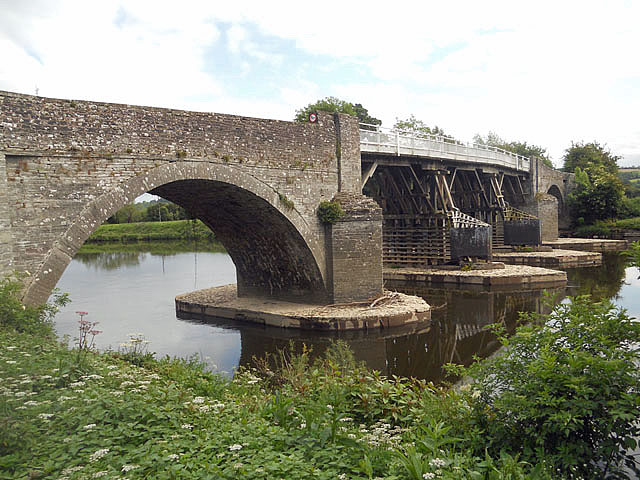
- Coordinates: 52.1201°N 3.0839°W
- OS grid reference: SO2588647428
- Carries: B4350
- Crosses: River Wye
- Locale: Whitney-on-Wye, Herefordshire
- Heritage status: Grade II

Characteristics
- Material: Stone and wood
- No. of spans: 3
- No. of lanes: 1

History
- Built: 1780
- Rebuilt: 1797

Statistics
- Toll: Free Motorcycles; £1.00 per day Vehicles up to 7.5t

Location
- Interactive map of Whitney-on-Wye Toll Bridge

Whitney-on-Wye toll bridge is a single-carriageway, wood- and stone-construction in Herefordshire, England. The toll bridge carries the B4350 south from its junction with the A438, near Whitney-on-Wye, across the River Wye. It comprises two Grade II listed structures.

== Bridge ==
Whitney Bridge Act 1780
- Act of Parliament
- Parliament of Great Britain
- Long title: An Act for building a Bridge across the River Wye, between Whitney and Clifford, in the County of Hereford.
- Citation: 20 Geo. 3. c. 27
- Territorial extent: Great Britain

Dates
- Royal assent: 4 May 1780
- Commencement: 25 November 1779 (Note: Start of session.)
Other legislation
| Amended by | Whitney Bridge Act 1797 |

Status: Amended

Text of statute as originally enacted

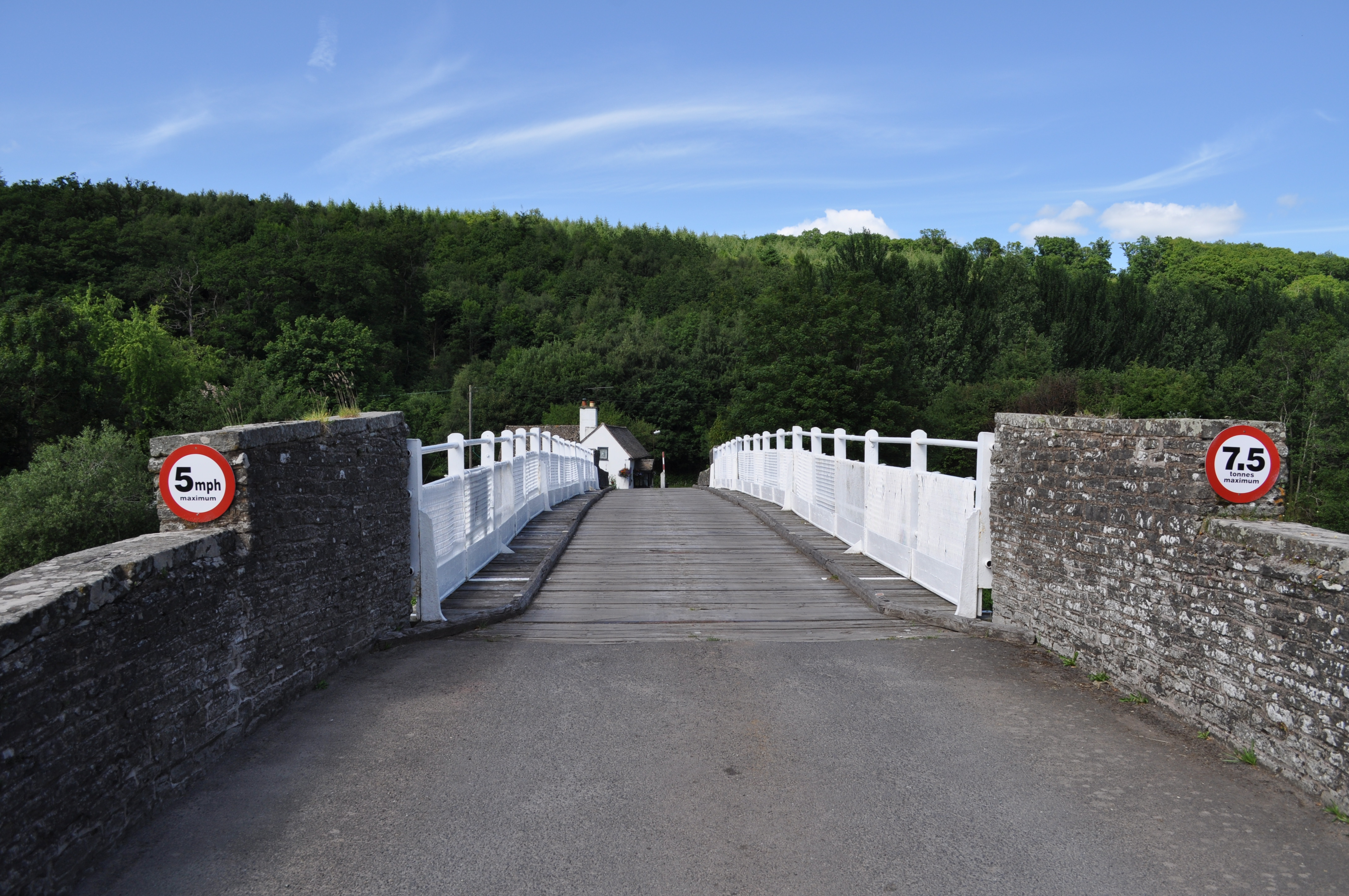
Looking across the toll bridge at Whitney-on-Wye.

A bridge was first built at the site following authorisation by the Whitney Bridge Act 1780 (20 Geo. 3. c. 27) and with the agreement of Tomkyns Dew, the lord of the manor. The stone structure of five bays replaced a ferry that had been operated by Dew. This bridge and two successors of similar design were all destroyed by flooding on the river, the last in 1795.

Whitney Bridge Act 1797
- Act of Parliament
- Parliament of Great Britain
- Long title: An act to amend an act made in the twentieth year of the reign of his present Majesty, for building a bridge across the river Wye, between Whitney and Clifford, in the county of Hereford.
- Citation: 37 Geo. 3. c. 56
- Territorial extent: Great Britain

Dates
- Royal assent: 9 May 1797
- Commencement: 9 May 1797 (Note: The Acts of Parliament (Commencement) Act 1793.)
Other legislation
| Amends | Whitney Bridge Act 1780 |

Status: Current legislation

Text of statute as originally enacted

Another act of Parliament, the Whitney Bridge Act 1797 (37 Geo. 3. c. 56) was passed in 1796, allowing the crossing to be partially rebuilt in 1797 to a different design that used stone and wood. The central three bays were at this time replaced with a wood decking and superstructure. This beam and trestle design comprising three spans is how the bridge appears today. The two outer spans are buttressed masonry archways of sandstone and ashlar; the central wooden section has two double pontoons to support it.

A major programme of reconstruction was undertaken in 1992–1993, costing around £300,000.

== Toll house ==
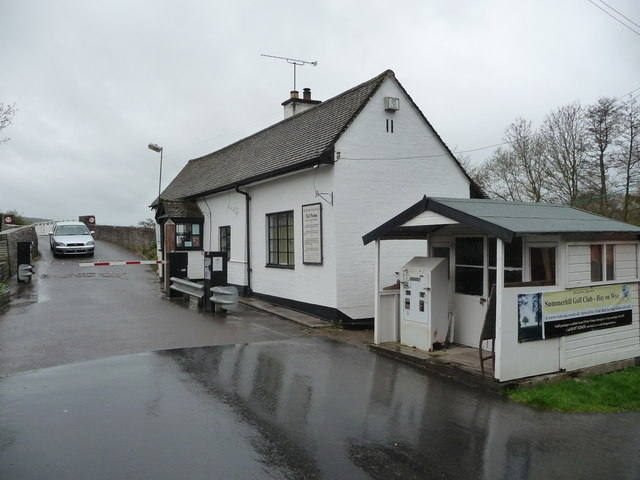
Toll house, Whitney-on-Wye.

The single-storey toll house on the northwest side of the crossing is also an 18th-century structure. Constructed in part of brick and in part of timber-framed stucco scantling, it was altered and extended to the rear in the mid-20th century. The toll house has a tariff board dated 1796 that lists the crossing charges that applied around that time.

The bridge and toll house are both Grade II listed buildings.

== Ownership ==
Whitney-On-Wye Bridge (Revision of Tolls) Order 2015 (Note: Section 1.)
- Statutory Instrument
- Parliament of the United Kingdom
- Citation: SI 2015/1404
- Territorial extent: United Kingdom

Dates
- Made: 22 June 2015
- Commencement: 29 June 2015
Other legislation
| Repeals/revokes | Whitney-on-Wye Bridge (Revision of Tolls) Order 2009 |
| Made under | Transport Charges &c. (Miscellaneous Provisions) Act 1954 |

Status: Unknown

Text of statute as originally enacted

The Longfellow family of Brecon were joint funders of the 1797 reconstruction and various descendants owned the bridge until 1981, when it was bought by a couple called Bryant. It changed hands again in 1990 and, for £300,000, in 2002. The present owners purchased it for £400,000 in 2012 and announced plans to develop the facilities. It was estimated at that time that the toll income would be around £2,000 per week, which is free of taxes in accordance with the act that authorised its construction. The tolls can only be increased with government permission and were last raised by the Whitney-On-Wye Bridge (Revision of Tolls) Order 2015 (SI 2015/1404) to £1 for cars, allowing multiple crossings in one day. Annual maintenance costs at the time of the 2012 change of ownership were estimated to be £12,000.

== See also ==
- List of crossings of the River Wye
