= Whitney-on-Wye =

Village in Herefordshire, England

Coordinates: 52.121°N 3.067°W

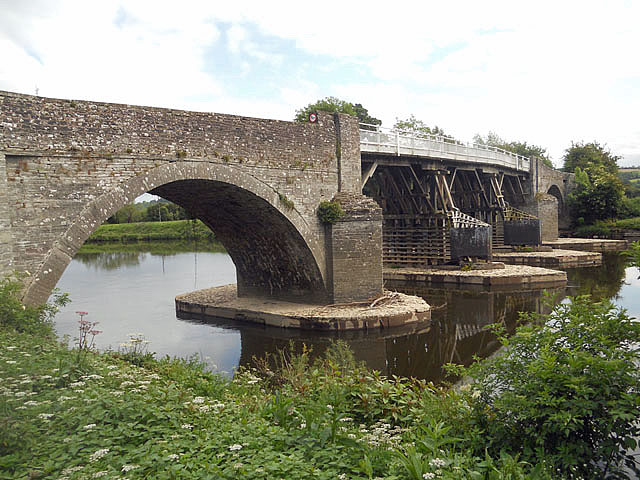
- Whitney-on-Wye Toll Bridge

- Location within Herefordshire
- Population: 117 (2011 census)
- Civil parish: Whitney-on-Wye
- Unitary authority: County of Herefordshire
- Ceremonial county: Herefordshire
- Region: West Midlands
- Country: England
- Sovereign state: United Kingdom
- Post town: HEREFORD
- Postcode district: HR3
- Police: West Mercia
- Fire: Hereford and Worcester
- Ambulance: West Midlands
- UK Parliament: North Herefordshire

Whitney-on-Wye is a village and civil parish in Herefordshire, England, and approximately 1 mile (1.6 km) east from the border with Wales. The village is on the A438 road, on the River Wye, and 16 mi (25 km) west from Hereford. Parish population in 2011 was 117.

The parish includes the hamlet of Millhalf (grid reference SO2789948154), 1,600 yards (1,500 m) east from Whitney village. West from Whitney village and south from the A438 is the late 18th-century Whitney-on-Wye toll bridge (grid reference SO2589247437), which bridges the Wye and connects the parish to that of Clifford.

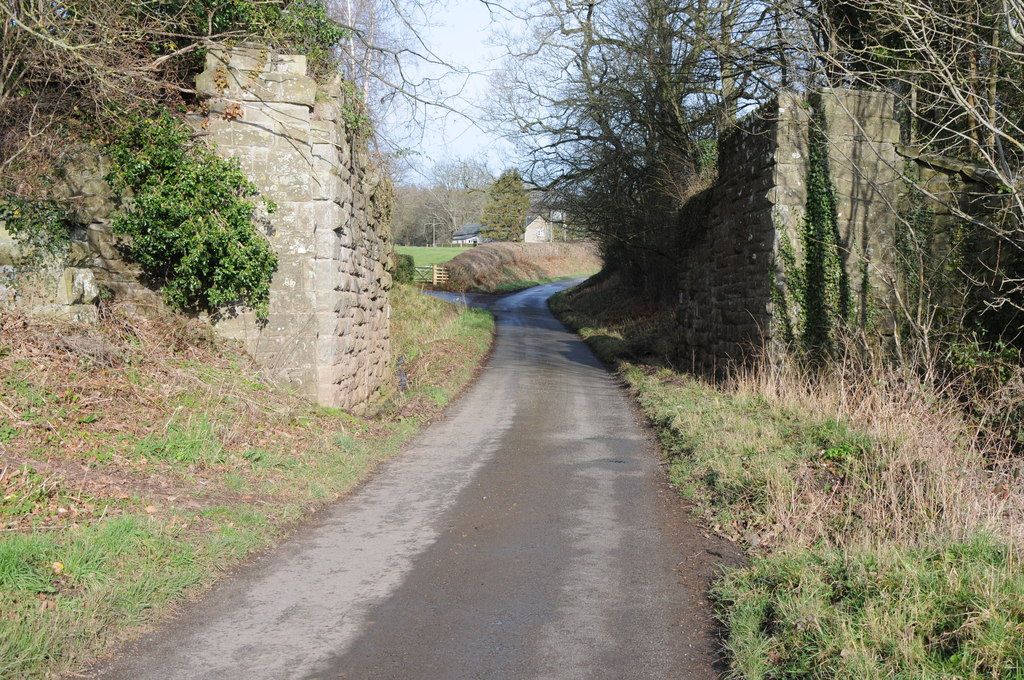
Railway bridge remains at Millhalf

The remains of the Hereford, Hay and Brecon Railway (built 1862 to 1864), crosses the parish, and through Whitney village and Millhalf.

The Grade II* listed parish church, dating to the 12th and rebuilt in the mid-18th century, is dedicated to the saints Peter and Paul.

Whitney-on-Wye was first mentioned in the Domesday Book with the spelling 'Witenie'. The most plausible meaning for the name is White Water, from the Anglo-Saxon hwit (white) and ey (water).

During the Captain Swing riot movement of 1830, Whitney was a site in Herefordshire for protest by the dispossessed farm labourers who threatened arson and machine breaking to try to obtain a living wage. On 17 November 1830, Henry Williams, a 'ranting' preacher and journeyman tailor wrote a threatening letter to a large farmer citing the fires that had been set in the barns of those who had ignored the poor in the county of Kent. For his pains he was sentenced to transportation to New South Wales.
