= Treason Act 1415 =

Act of the Parliament of England

- Act of Parliament
- Parliament of England
- Long title: It shall be treason to clip, wash, or file money.
- Citation: 4 Hen. 5. Stat. 1. c. 6
- Territorial extent: England and Wales; Ireland

Dates
- Royal assent: 1415
- Commencement: 16 March 1416 (Note: Start of session.)
- Repealed: 1 May 1832
Other legislation
Amended by	Treason Act 1553; Clipping Coin Act 1562; Coin Act 1575
Repealed by	Coinage Offences Act 1832
Relates to	Treason Act 1351; Forgery Act 1415

Status: Repealed

Text of statute as originally enacted

Forgery Act 1415
- Act of Parliament
- Parliament of England
- Long title: None
- Citation: [4 Hen. 5. Stat. 1]]. c. 7 (Note: This is the citation in The Statutes of the Realm.); 4 Hen. 5. c. 7 (Note: This is the citation in The Statutes at Large.)
- Territorial extent: England and Wales; Ireland

Dates
- Royal assent: 1415
- Commencement: 16 March 1416 (Note: Start of session.)
- Repealed: 1 May 1832
Other legislation
Repealed by	Coinage Offences Act 1832
Relates to	Treason Act 1351; Treason Act 1415

Status: Repealed

Text of statute as originally enacted

Coin Act 1572
- Act of Parliament
- Parliament of England
- Long title: An Act against the forging and counterfeiting of Foreign Coin, being not current within this Realm.
- Citation: 14 Eliz. 1. c. 3
- Territorial extent: England and Wales

Dates
- Royal assent: 30 June 1572
- Commencement: 8 May 1572 (Note: Start of session.)
- Repealed: 1 May 1832
Other legislation
Repealed by	Coinage Offences Act 1832
Relates to	Treason Act 1351; Clipping Coin Act 1562; Coin Act 1575; Coin Act 1696; Coin Act 1732; Counterfeiting Coin Act 1741

Status: Repealed

Text of statute as originally enacted

Coin Act 1575
- Act of Parliament
- Parliament of England
- Long title: An Act against diminishing and impairing of the Queen's Majesty's Coins, and other Coins lawfully current within the Realm.
- Citation: 18 Eliz. 1. c. 1
- Territorial extent: England and Wales

Dates
- Royal assent: 15 March 1576
- Commencement: 8 February 1576 (Note: Start of session.)
- Repealed: 1 May 1832
Other legislation
Repealed by	Coinage Offences Act 1832
Relates to	Treason Act 1351; Clipping Coin Act 1562; Rebellion Act 1572; Escape of Traitors Act 1572; Coin Act 1572; Coin Act 1696; Coin Act 1732; Counterfeiting Coin Act 1741

Status: Repealed

Text of statute as originally enacted

The Treason Act 1415 (4 Hen. 5. Stat. 1. c. 6) was an act of the Parliament of England which made clipping coins high treason, punishable by death. (The Treason Act 1351 (25 Edw. 3 Stat. 5. c. 2) had already made it treason to counterfeit coins.)

The act was repealed by the Treason Act 1553 (1 Mar. Sess. 1. c. 1), but was revived by the Clipping Coin Act 1562 (5 Eliz. 1. c. 11).

The act originally only protected English coins, but was later extended by the Coin Act 1575 (18 Eliz. 1. c. 1) in 1575 to cover foreign coins "current" within England.

By this time the Coin Act 1572 (14 Eliz. 1. c. 3) had already made it misprision of treason to clip foreign coins not current within the Realm.

Another act in 1415, the Forgery Act 1415 (4 Hen. 5. Stat. 1. c. 7), extended the jurisdiction to try this category of treason to all justices in the realm, instead of just the select few known as the King's justices.

The Coin Act 1575 (18 Eliz. 1. c. 1) also abolished (for coin clipping only) the penalties of corruption of blood and forfeiture of goods and lands.

The acts were repealed by section 1 of the Coinage Offences Act 1832 (2 & 3 Will. 4. c. 34).

== See also ==
- Coin Act 1696
- High treason in the United Kingdom
- Treason Act
