= Counterfeiting Coin Act 1797 =

Act of the Parliament of Great Britain

- Act of Parliament
- Parliament of Great Britain
- Long title: An Act to prevent the counterfeiting any Copper Coin in this Realm, made or to be made, current by Proclamation, or any foreign Gold or Silver Coin; and to prevent the bringing into this Realm, or uttering, any counterfeit foreign Gold or Silver Coin.
- Citation: 37 Geo. 3. c. 126
- Territorial extent: Great Britain

Dates
- Royal assent: 19 July 1797
- Commencement: 19 July 1797 (Note: Section 1.)
- Repealed: 1 November 1861
Other legislation
Amends	Counterfeiting Coin Act 1741
Amended by	Coinage Offences Act 1832
Repealed by	Criminal Statutes Repeal Act 1861
Relates to	Counterfeiting of Copper Coin Act 1771

Status: Repealed

Text of statute as originally enacted

The Counterfeiting Coin Act 1797 (37 Geo. 3. c. 126) was an act of the Parliament of Great Britain which made it high treason to counterfeit copper coins. The Counterfeiting Coin Act 1741 (15 Geo. 2 c. 28) had already made it treason to counterfeit some copper coins, namely halfpennies and farthings, but counterfeiting other copper coins was only a misdemeanour. On 19 July 1797 Parliament extended the scope of that act to cover all coins made of copper. The acts are now repealed.

The long title of the act was "An Act to prevent the counterfeiting any Copper Coin in this Realm, made or to be made, current by Proclamation, or any foreign Gold or Silver Coin; and to prevent the bringing into this Realm, or uttering, any counterfeit foreign Gold or Silver Coin."

== Provisions ==
=== Offences ===
Section 1 extended to all copper coins the provisions of the 1741 act which applied to halfpennies and farthings. (That act had made it high treason to file, alter, wash or colour halfpennies or farthings, or to make such coins look like a shilling or sixpence.) The same section also extended another act, 11 Geo. 3. c. 40 (1771), to cover all copper coins (which had made it a felony to export or counterfeit halfpennies and farthings).

The act did not only deal with copper coins. Section 2 made it a felony to counterfeit the gold or silver coins of foreign countries, and section 3 made it a felony to import such counterfeits into Great Britain. These offences were punished with transportation for 7 years. The act also punished the tendering of counterfeit coins in payment, and the possession of them.

=== Procedure ===
Section 8 stated that no proceedings for offences under the act could be "quashed for want of form," and there could be no appeal by certiorari to the king's courts of record in Westminster.

Section 9 required that offences under the act had to be prosecuted within 3 months, or else the defendant must be acquitted and paid treble his costs by the prosecutor.

== See also ==
- High treason in the United Kingdom
- Treason Act
