= Coin Act 1732 =

Act of the Parliament of Great Britain

- Act of Parliament
- Parliament of Great Britain
- Long title: An Act to prevent the coining or counterfeiting any of the gold coins commonly called Broad Pieces.
- Citation: 6 Geo. 2. c. 26
- Territorial extent: Great Britain

Dates
- Royal assent: 13 June 1733
- Commencement: 16 January 1733 (Note: Start of session.)
- Repealed: 15 July 1867
Other legislation
Repealed by	Statute Law Revision Act 1867
Relates to	Coin Act 1572; Coin Act 1575; Coin Act 1696; Counterfeiting Coin Act 1741

Status: Repealed

Text of statute as originally enacted

The Coin Act 1732 (6 Geo. 2. c. 26) was an act of the Parliament of Great Britain which made it high treason to counterfeit gold coins. Its title was "An Act to prevent the coining or counterfeiting any of the gold coins commonly called Broad Pieces".

Broad pieces were gold coins in denominations of 23 or 25 shillings. A royal proclamation in February 1732 had prohibited people from giving or receiving in payment broad pieces, or halves or quarters of them, and had required revenue collectors to collect them in order that they could be melted down and made into new gold coins. To encourage people to surrender their coins, the revenue collectors were authorised to purchase them at favourable rates, which unintentionally created an incentive for people to counterfeit them. Accordingly, an act was passed which made it treason to counterfeit them, or to "utter or vend any of the said gold coins, knowing them to be so forged, counterfeited or coined as aforesaid". There was a £40 reward for anyone whose information led to someone being convicted of treason under the act, and any convicted traitor was to be automatically pardoned if he informed on somebody else and the person informed on was convicted.

The act required prosecutions for this kind of treason to begin within six months of the offence. The penalty was death, but there was to be no corruption of blood. The rules of evidence and procedure were to be the same as in other cases of counterfeiting coins.

== Subsequent developments ==
The whole act was repealed by section 1 of, and the schedule to, the Statute Law Revision Act 1867 (30 & 31 Vict. c. 59).

== See also ==
- High treason in the United Kingdom
- Coin Acts 1572 and 1575
- Coin Act 1696
- Counterfeiting Coin Act 1741
- Treason Act
