= 3rd Parliament of William III =

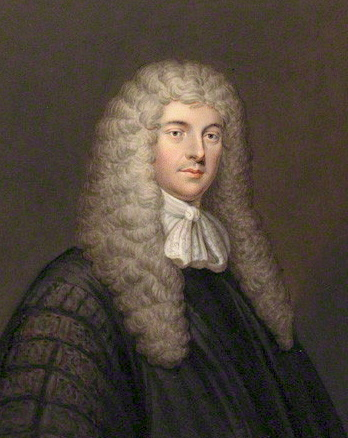
Paul Foley, Speaker

The 3rd Parliament of William III was summoned by William III of England on 12 October 1695 and assembled on 22 November 1695. It was the first election to be contested under the terms of the new Triennial Act 1694 passed in the previous Parliament which, amongst other things, limited the duration of the Parliament to 3 years. Its composition was 257 Whigs, 203 Tories and 53 others; Paul Foley, a Country Whig and member for Hereford, was installed as Speaker of the House of Commons.

== Sessions ==
In the first session of 1695–96 there was deadlock between the main parties over the issues of the value of the coinage (due to clipping and the adverse rate of exchange) and the proposal to set up a Council of Trade. A sudden threat of invasion unified the Whigs behind the First Whig Junto and enabled the Whig-dominated ministry to effect the recoinage on its own terms and establish a crown-appointed, rather than Parliament appointed, Board of Trade.

In the second session a major event was the attainder of the Jacobite conspirator Sir John Fenwick. The proceedings were expedited when Fenwick threatened to implicate leading Whigs in the plot and the Attainder Bill was passed with a small majority in spite of there being only one prosecution witness. Fenwick was beheaded on 28 January 1697. His horse White Sorrel was claimed by the King and later stumbled and unseated him, hastening his death.

Other debate concerned the Chancellor of the Exchequer's efforts to raise money for the war effort. Although he successfully got approval for an extension of the Bank of England's privileges until 1710 in return for a new loan of £5 million, he was defeated in his efforts to impose new duties on wine and textiles.

By the time the third and final session started in December 1697 the continental war had ended with the signing of the Treaty of Ryswick. Although the King wanted to maintain the large army as a deterrent, the Commons forced him to reduce it to 10,000 men.

== Notable acts of the Parliament ==
- Corrupt Practices Act 1695
- Parliamentary Elections Act 1695
- Parliamentary Elections (Returns) Act 1695
- Plantation Trade Act 1695
- Quakers Act 1695
- Security of King and Government Act 1695
- Treason Act 1695
- Administration of Justice Act 1696
- Attainder of Sir John Fenwick Act 1696
- Bank of England Act 1696
- Blackwell Hall Act 1696
- Coin Act 1696
- Escape of Debtors, etc. Act 1696
- Blasphemy Act 1697
- Civil List Act 1697
- New Forest Act 1697
- Poor Act 1697

== See also ==
- 1695 English general election
- First Whig Junto 1694–1699
- List of acts of the 1st session of the 3rd Parliament of King William III
- List of acts of the 2nd session of the 3rd Parliament of King William III
- List of acts of the 3rd session of the 3rd Parliament of King William III
- List of parliaments of England
