= 1st Parliament of Queen Anne =

Act Reform of 1702

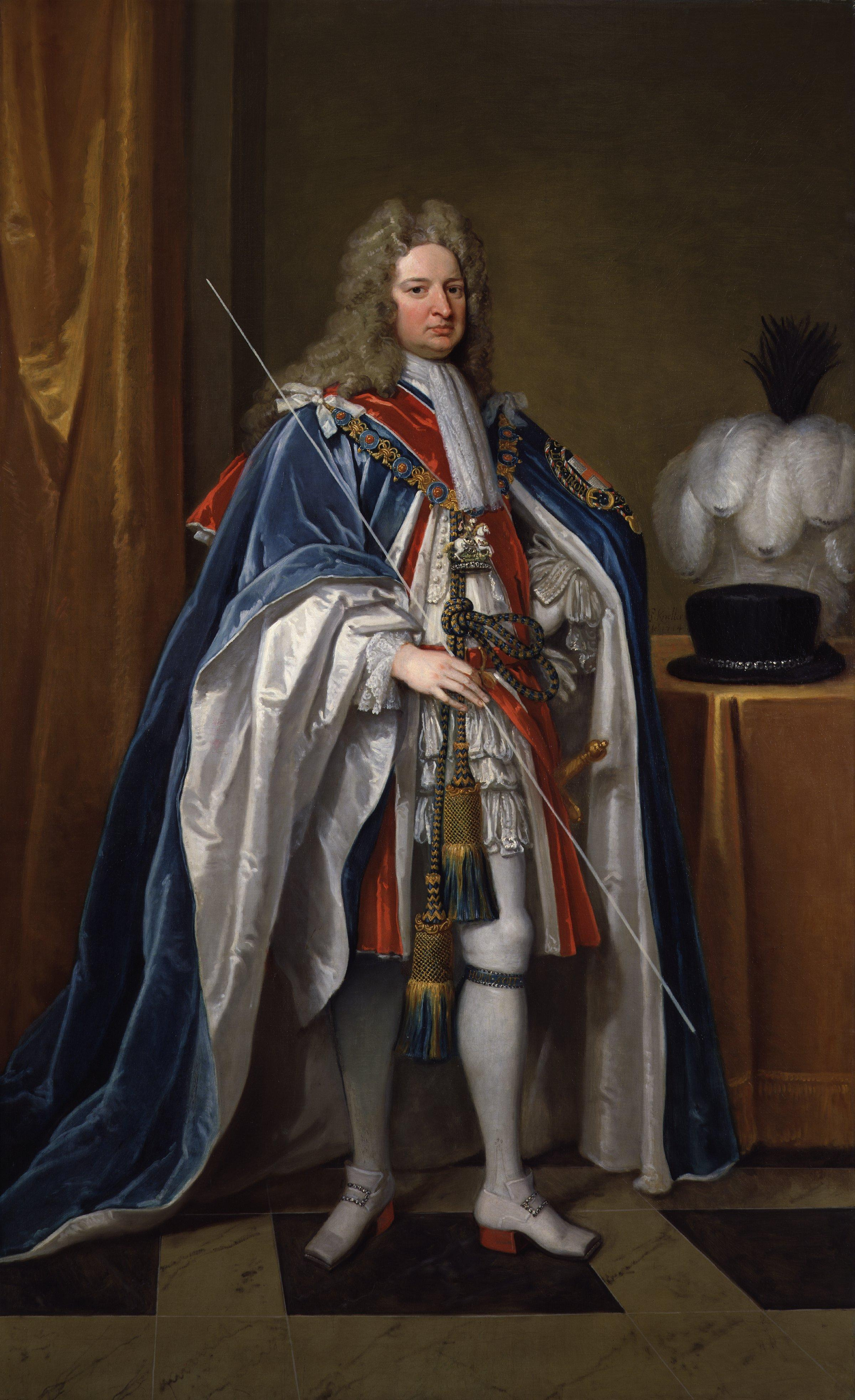
Robert Harley, Speaker

The 1st Parliament of Queen Anne was summoned by Queen Anne of England on 2 July 1702 and assembled on 20 August 1702 (but prorogued until 20 October 1702). Its composition was 298 Tories, 184 Whigs and 31 others, representing a large swing to the Tories since the previous election. Robert Harley, the member for Radnor, was re-elected Speaker of the House of Commons.

== Overview ==
Queen Anne's new ministry was Tory dominated, led by Sidney Godolphin, 1st Earl of Godolphin at the Treasury and Marlborough as the commander of the army (The major War of the Spanish Succession was now in full progress). Anne's commitment to the Church of England also ensured the presence of several High Church Tories in the government, including her uncle Laurence Hyde, 1st Earl of Rochester.

However, disputes between Godolphin and Rochester forced the latter's resignation from the Cabinet in February 1703. The attitudes of the High Church Tories hardened against the expensive war and they became obstructive to the point that Queen Anne was obliged to replace them at the end of the second session. The speaker Robert Harley replaced Lord Nottingham as Secretary of State for the Northern Department in addition to his Parliamentary role.

The third session saw the Aliens Bill introduced, which threatened that unless Scotland agreed to negotiate terms for union with England and accepted the Hanoverian succession by 25 December 1705, there would be a ban on the import of Scottish products. In addition Scots would also lose the privileges accorded to English nationals, endangering their rights to any property they held in England.

Following a prorogation in March 1705, the Parliament was dissolved on 5 April 1705.

== Notable acts passed by the parliament ==
- Bridges Act 1702
- Crown Lands Act 1702
- Demise of the Crown Act 1702
- Purchasers of Forfeited Estates (Ireland) Act 1702
- Treason Act 1702
- Mutiny Act 1703
- Queen Anne's Bounty Act 1703
- Recruiting Act 1703
- Correspondence with Enemies Act 1704
- Trade with France Act 1704
- Administration of Justice Act 1705
- Bankruptcy Act 1705
- Sophia Naturalization Act 1705
- Regency Act 1705
- Alien Act 1705

== See also ==
- List of acts of the 1st session of the 1st Parliament of Queen Anne
- List of acts of the 2nd session of the 1st Parliament of Queen Anne
- List of acts of the 3rd session of the 1st Parliament of Queen Anne
- List of parliaments of England
