= 6th Parliament of William III =

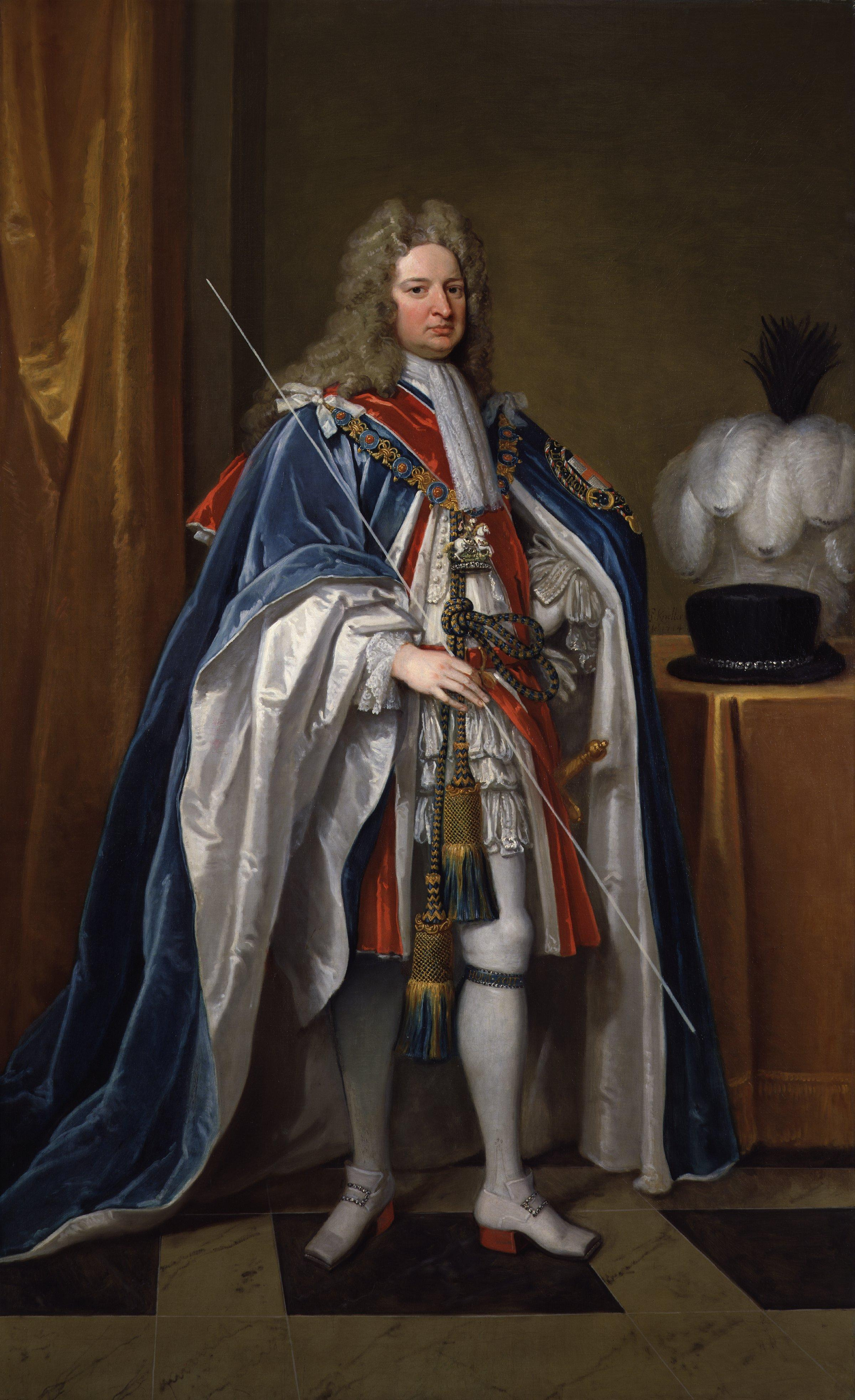
Robert Harley, Speaker

The 6th Parliament of William III was summoned by William III of England on 3 November 1701 and assembled on 30 December 1701. Its composition was 248 Whigs, 240 Tories and 24 others; Robert Harley, the member for Radnor, was re-elected Speaker of the House of Commons.

== Alliance with the Holy Roman Empire against France ==
Louis XIV of France had made plain his expansionist aims in Europe with the threat that posed to English interests and public opinion was now in favour of war. The new Parliament busied itself with the necessary preparations. On 9 January 1702, the House of Commons received the text of the Grand Alliance between William III, Leopold I, Holy Roman Emperor and the Dutch Republic. Both parties co-operated to fulfil the king's requests and by the end of February the ways and means arrangements were almost complete.

== Death of William III and rise of Anne to the throne ==
But on 7 March 1702 the news broke that William III was dying and hurried arrangements were made to complete the war preparations. The following day the king was dead and had been succeeded by his sister-in-law, Queen Anne. Under the Parliament Act 1695 (7 & 8 Will. 3. c. 15) Parliament continued to meet for the next two months to enable the new queen and her ministers to finalise the essential war measures. On 2 May 1702 the queen communicated to the Commons the declaration of war by England and her allies on France and Spain.

The parliament was dissolved on 2 July 1702.

== Notable acts passed by the parliament ==
- Affirmation by Quakers Act 1701
- Correspondence with James the Pretender (High Treason) Act 1701
- Security of the Succession, etc. Act 1701

== See also ==
- List of acts of the 6th Parliament of King William III
- List of parliaments of England
