= List of acts of the Parliament of England from 1704 =

This is a list of acts of the Parliament of England for the year 1704.

For acts passed during the period 1707–1800, see the list of acts of the Parliament of Great Britain. See also the list of acts of the Parliament of Scotland, and the list of acts of the Parliament of Ireland.

For acts passed from 1801 onwards, see the list of acts of the Parliament of the United Kingdom. For acts of the devolved parliaments and assemblies in the United Kingdom, see the list of acts of the Scottish Parliament, the list of acts of the Northern Ireland Assembly, and the list of acts and measures of Senedd Cymru; see also the list of acts of the Parliament of Northern Ireland.

For medieval statutes, etc. that are not considered to be acts of Parliament, see the list of English statutes.

See also the List of ordinances and acts of the Parliament of England, 1642–1660 for ordinances and acts passed by the Long Parliament and other bodies without royal assent, and which were not considered to be valid legislation following the Restoration in 1660.

The number shown after each act's title is its chapter number. Acts are cited using this number, preceded by the years of the reign during which the relevant parliamentary session was held; thus the Union with Ireland Act 1800 is cited as "39 & 40 Geo. 3. c. 67", meaning the 67th act passed during the session that started in the 39th year of the reign of George III and which finished in the 40th year of that reign. The modern convention is to use Arabic numerals in citations (thus "41 Geo. 3" rather than "41 Geo. III"). Acts of the last session of the Parliament of Great Britain and the first session of the Parliament of the United Kingdom are both cited as "41 Geo. 3".

Acts passed by the Parliament of England did not have a short title; however, some of these acts have subsequently been given a short title by acts of the Parliament of the United Kingdom, such as the Short Titles Act 1896 (59 & 60 Vict. c. 14).

Acts passed by the Parliament of England were deemed to have come into effect on the first day of the session in which they were passed. Because of this, the years given in the list below may in fact be the year before a particular act was passed.

== 3 & 4 Ann. ==
The third session of the 1st Parliament of Queen Anne, which met from 24 October 1704 until 14 March 1705.

This session was also traditionally cited as 3 & 4 Anne or 3 & 4 A.

=== Public acts ===
Short title	Citation	Royal assent
Long title
Land Tax Act 1704 (repealed)	3 & 4 Ann. c. 1	9 December 1704
An Act for granting an Aid to Her Majesty, by a Land Tax, to be raised in the Year One Thousand Seven Hundred and Five. (Repealed by Statute Law Revision Act 1867 (30 & 31 Vict. c. 59))
Annuities Act 1704 (repealed)	3 & 4 Ann. c. 2	16 January 1705
An Act for raising Monies, by Sale of several Annuities, for carrying on the present War. (Note: The War of the Spanish Succession.) (Repealed by Statute Law Revision Act 1867 (30 & 31 Vict. c. 59))
Taxation Act 1704 (repealed)	3 & 4 Ann. c. 3 (Note: This is the citation in The Statutes of the Realm.); 3 & 4 Ann. c. 5 (Note: This is the citation in The Statutes at Large.)	14 March 1705
An Act for granting to Her Majesty a further Subsidy on Wines and Merchandizes imported. (Repealed by Statute Law Revision Act 1867 (30 & 31 Vict. c. 59))
Grant to Duke of Marlborough Act 1704 (repealed)	3 & 4 Ann. c. 4; 3 & 4 Ann. c. 6	14 March 1705
An Act for the better enabling Her Majesty to grant the Honour and Manor of Woodstock, with the Hundred of Wootton, to the Duke of Marlborough and his Heirs, in Consideration of the eminent Services by him performed to Her Majesty and the Public. (Repealed by Statute Law (Repeals) Act 1978 (c. 45))
Mutiny Act 1704 (repealed)	3 & 4 Ann. c. 5; 3 & 4 Ann. c. 16	14 March 1705
An Act for punishing Mutiny and Desertion, and false Musters; and for the better Payment of the Army and Quarters. (Repealed by Statute Law Revision Act 1867 (30 & 31 Vict. c. 59))
Union of England and Scotland Act 1704 or the Alien Act 1705 (repealed)	3 & 4 Ann. c. 6; 3 & 4 Ann. c. 7	14 March 1705
An Act for the effectual securing the Kingdom of England from the apparent Dangers that may arise from several Acts lately passed in the Parliament of Scotland. (Repealed by Statute Law Revision Act 1867 (30 & 31 Vict. c. 59))
Exportations, etc. Act 1704 (repealed)	3 & 4 Ann. c. 7; 3 & 4 Ann. c. 8	14 March 1705
An Act to permit the Exportation of Irish Linen Cloth to the Plantations, and to prohibit the Importation of Scotch Linen into Ireland. (Repealed by Customs Law Repeal Act 1825 (6 Geo. 4. c. 105))
Bills of Exchange Act 1704 (repealed)	3 & 4 Ann. c. 8; 3 & 4 Ann. c. 9	14 March 1705
An Act for giving like Remedy upon Promissory Notes as is now used upon Bills of Exchange, and for the better Payment of Inland Bills of Exchange. (Repealed by Bills of Exchange Act 1882 (45 & 46 Vict. c. 61))
Importation Act 1704 (repealed)	3 & 4 Ann. c. 9; 3 & 4 Ann. c. 10	14 March 1705
An Act for encouraging the Importation of Naval Stores from Her Majesty's Plantations in America. (Repealed by Statute Law Revision Act 1867 (30 & 31 Vict. c. 59))
Recruiting Act 1704 (repealed)	3 & 4 Ann. c. 10; 3 & 4 Ann. c. 11	14 March 1705
An Act for the better recruiting Her Majesty's Land Forces, and the Marines, for the Year One Thousand Seven Hundred and Five. (Repealed by Statute Law Revision Act 1867 (30 & 31 Vict. c. 59))
Thomas Pitkin's Bankruptcy Act 1704 (repealed)	3 & 4 Ann. c. 11; 3 & 4 Ann. c. 12	14 March 1705
An Act for the Relief of the Creditors of Thomas Pitkin, a Bankrupt; and for the apprehending of him, and the Discovery of the Effects of the said Thomas Pitkin and his Accomplices. (Repealed by Statute Law Revision Act 1948 (11 & 12 Geo. 6. c. 62))
Trade with France Act 1704 (repealed)	3 & 4 Ann. c. 12; 3 & 4 Ann. c. 13	14 March 1705
An Act for prohibiting all Trade and Commerce with France. (Repealed by Statute Law Revision Act 1867 (30 & 31 Vict. c. 59))
Correspondence with Enemies Act 1704 (repealed)	3 & 4 Ann. c. 13; 3 & 4 Ann. c. 14	14 March 1705
An Act to prevent all traiterous Correspondence with Her Majesty's Enemies. (Repealed by Statute Law Revision Act 1867 (30 & 31 Vict. c. 59))
Annuities, etc. Act 1704 (repealed)	3 & 4 Ann. c. 14; 3 & 4 Ann. c. 15	14 March 1705
An Act for Relief of Fulke Emes Gentleman, and others, who had elapsed their Times, either for paying their Money, or naming their Nominees, for purchasing Annuities; and also for Relief of Sir John Mead Knight and Baronet, who had elapsed his Time for paying Part of his Purchase-money for a forfeited Estate in Ireland; and also for Relief of Dorothy Ireland and others, in respect of several Tickets for Payment of Annuities, and of several Million Lottery and Malt Lottery Tickets, and Exchequer Bills, and Debentures of the Army, which have been burnt or lost. (Repealed by Statute Law Revision Act 1867 (30 & 31 Vict. c. 59))
Militia Act 1704 (repealed)	3 & 4 Ann. c. 15; 3 & 4 Ann. c. 17	14 March 1705
An Act for raising the Militia for the Year One Thousand Seven Hundred and Five, although the Month's Pay formerly advanced be not re-paid. (Repealed by Statute Law Revision Act 1867 (30 & 31 Vict. c. 59))
Perpetuation and Amendment of Laws Act 1704 (repealed)	3 & 4 Ann. c. 16; 3 & 4 Ann. c. 18	14 March 1705
An Act for making perpetual an Act, (Note: Recovery of Small Tithes Act 1695 (7 & 8 Will. 3. c. 6)) for the more easy Recovery of small Tithes; and also an Act (Note: Partition Act 1696 (8 & 9 Will. 3. c. 31)) for the more easy obtaining Partition of Lands in Coparcenary, Joint Tenancy, and Tenancy in Common; and also for making more effectual and amending several Acts, (Note: Estreats (Personal Representatives) Act 1692 (4 Will. & Mar. c. 24)) (Note: Juries Act 1695 (7 & 8 Will. 3. c. 32)) (Note: Continuance of Laws Act 1702 (1 Ann. St. 2. c. 13)) relating to the Return of Jurors. (Repealed by Statute Law Revision Act 1867 (30 & 31 Vict. c. 59))
Taxation (No. 2) Act 1704 (repealed)	3 & 4 Ann. c. 17; 3 & 4 Ann. c. 3	16 January 1705
An Act for continuing the Duties upon Malt, Mum, Cyder, and Perry, for One Year. (Repealed by Statute Law Revision Act 1867 (30 & 31 Vict. c. 59))
Taxation (No. 3) Act 1704 (repealed)	3 & 4 Ann. c. 18; 3 & 4 Ann. c. 4	14 March 1705
An Act for continuing Duties upon Low Wines, and upon Coffee, Tea, Chocolate, Spices, and Pictures; and upon Hawkers, Pedlars, and Petty Chapmen, and upon Muslins; and for granting new Duties upon several of the said Commodities, and also upon Callicoes, China Ware, and Drugs. (Repealed by Statute Law Revision Act 1867 (30 & 31 Vict. c. 59))
Ulster Society Act 1704	3 & 4 Ann. c. 19 (Note: Also listed as 3 & 4 Ann. c. 1 Pr.); 3 & 4 Ann. c. 1 Pr.	9 December 1704
An Act for selling the Right of severall Parcells of Land and other Tenements and of certain Fishings and Tythes of Fishings in the Society of the Governour and Assistants London of the new Plantation in Ulster within the Realme of Ireland and their Successors and for settling a Rent Charge of Two hundred and fifty Pounds per Annum upon the Lord Bishop of Derry and his Sucessors for ever.

=== Private acts ===
Short title	Citation	Royal assent
Long title
Ulster Society Act 1704	3 & 4 Ann. c. 1 Pr. (Note: Also listed as 3 & 4 Ann. c. 19.)	9 December 1704
An Act for settling the Right of several Parcels of Land and other Tenements, and of certain Fishings and Tithes of Fishings, in the Society of the Governor and Assistants, London, of the new Plantation in Ulster, within the Realm of Ireland, and their Successors; and for settling a Rent Charge of Two Hundred and Fifty Pounds per Annum upon the Lord Bishop of Derry, and his Successors for ever.
Viscount Teviott's Naturalization Act 1704	3 & 4 Ann. c. 2 Pr.	9 December 1704
An Act for naturalizing Thomas Levingston, Viscount Teviott in the Kingdom of Scotland.
Cresset's Naturalization Act 1704	3 & 4 Ann. c. 3 Pr.	9 December 1704
An Act for naturalizing Louise Marie Cressett, the Wife of James Cressett Esquire.
Freke's Estate Act 1704	3 & 4 Ann. c. 4 Pr.	16 January 1705
An Act to enable Thomas Pile Esquire and Elizabeth Freke to make Leases for Lives of the Estate of Thomas Freke, of Iwerne Courtney, Esquire, deceased; as also the Son of George Pitt Esquire so to do, when entitled, and in actual Possession of the Premises; and that he may be enabled to make a Jointure, upon any Woman he shall marry, out of the same; and for establishing a School in Iwerne Courtney, and augmenting the Vicarage of Cerne Abbas, in the County of Dorsett.
Enabling Agnes Hacche, widow, and other trustees to make leases and sell lands in Devon for payment of Robert Hacche's debts and legacies and for the maintenance and advancement of his daughters' portions.	3 & 4 Ann. c. 5 Pr.	16 January 1705
An Act to enable Agnes Hacche Widow, and other Trustees, to make Leases, and sell Lands, in the County of Devon, for the Payment of the Debts and Legacies of Robert Hacche Esquire, deceased; and for the Maintenance and Advancement of his Daughters Portions.
Gould's Estate Act 1704	3 & 4 Ann. c. 6 Pr.	16 January 1705
An Act for confirming an Agreement between the Executors of Moses Gould Esquire, deceased, and his Relict, for Payment of the Debts, and Maintenance of the Younger Children, of the said Moscs Gould; and for settling other Part of his Estate.
Drake's Estate Act 1704	3 & 4 Ann. c. 7 Pr.	16 January 1705
An Act for Sale of the Estate of Daniel Drake Gentleman, deceased, for the Provision of his Widow and Children, according to his Will.
Bowman's Naturalization Act 1704	3 & 4 Ann. c. 8 Pr.	16 January 1705
An Act for naturalizing of Henry Bowman.
Estate of William Duke of Devonshire and William Cavendish Marquis of Hartington: mortgage for payment of debts.	3 & 4 Ann. c. 9 Pr.	14 March 1705
An Act for vesting in Trustees certain Manors and Lands of William Duke of Devonshire and William Cavendish (commonly called Marquis of Hartington) to enable them to mortgage the same, for Payment of Debts; and, subject thereunto, to settle the same to the like Uses as the same is now settled.
Enabling John Lord Poulett and Bridget his wife to sell their interest in certain manors and lands in Kent and to purchase others to be settled to the same uses.	3 & 4 Ann. c. 10 Pr.	14 March 1705
An Act to enable the Right Honourable John Lord Poulett and Bridget Lady Poulett his Wife, with the Consent of their Trustees, to sell their Shares and Interest of and in certain Manors and Lands, in the County of Kent; and to purchase other Lands or Hereditaments, of the like Value, to be settled to the same Uses.
Baron of Escrick's Estate Act 1704	3 & 4 Ann. c. 11 Pr.	14 March 1705
An Act to vest the Estate of Charles Lord Howard Baron of Escrick in Trustees, to sell the same, for Payment of his Debts.
Charles Earl of Burlington and Corke's estates in England and Ireland: sale for payment of debts.	3 & 4 Ann. c. 12 Pr.	14 March 1705
An Act for Sale of several Estates in England and Ireland, for Payment of the Debts of Charles late Earl of Burlington and Corke.
Confirming an agreement between John Earl of Kildare, Richard Lord Bellew and Francis his wife, Charlotte Countess of Newburgh and William Rowley, and sale of part of the Earl of Kildare's estate.	3 & 4 Ann. c. 13 Pr.	14 March 1705
An Act for confirming an Agreement made by certain Articles, by and between John Earl of Kildare, Richard Lord Bellew, both of the Kingdom of Ireland, and Frances his Lady, Charlotte Countess of Newburgh, of the Kingdom of Scotland, and William Rowley Esquire; and for selling Part of the Estate of the said Earl of Kildare, for the Purposes therein mentioned.
Confirmation of agreement between Bishop of Carlisle and Thomas Coke for vesting Melbourne rectory (Derbyshire) in Thomas Coke and his heirs on augmentation of the rents to the bishopric of Carlisle and of the stipend to the vicar of Melbourne.	3 & 4 Ann. c. 14 Pr.	14 March 1705
An Act for Confirmation of an Agreement made between Thomas late Lord Bishop of Carlisle, and Thomas Coke Esquire, for vesting the Rectory of Melborne, in the County of Derby, in the said Thomas Coke and his Heirs, upon Augmentation of the Rents to the Bishopric of Carlisle, and of the Stipend to the Vicar of Melborne.
Williams' Estate Act 1704	3 & 4 Ann. c. 15 Pr.	14 March 1705
An Act for Sale of several Manors and Lands, in the Counties of Hereford, Radnor, and Brecon, for Payment of the Debts of Richard and Thomas Williams, late of Cabalva, in the County of Radnor, Esquire, deceased.
Malett's Estate Act 1704	3 & 4 Ann. c. 16 Pr.	14 March 1705
An Act for vesting in Trustees all the Estate of Baldwyn Malett Esquire, and William Malett his Son and Heir Apparent, for Payment of the Debts of the said Baldwyn Malett to Her Majesty, as he was Receiver General for the County of Somerset, and City and County of the City of Bristoll; and for settling the Residue on the said William Malett, his Heirs and Assigns for ever, as by Agreement between the said Baldwyn Malett and William Malett.
Thomas Cobb's Debts Act 1704	3 & 4 Ann. c. 17 Pr.	14 March 1705
An Act to empower the Lord High Treasurer, or Commissioners of the Treasury, to compound with Richard Cobb Esquire, as One of the Sureties for Thomas Cobb Gentleman, deceased, Receiver General for the County of Southampton and Isle of Wight.
Empowering the Treasury to compound with the sureties for Augustine Briggs Receiver General for Norfolk and Norwich.	3 & 4 Ann. c. 18 Pr.	14 March 1705
An Act to empower the Lord High Treasurer, or Commissioners of the Treasury, to compound with John Drake, John Dunton, and Edm'd Cocke, as Sureties for Augustine Briggs, Receiver General for the County of Norfolke and City of Norwich.
Empowering the Treasury to compound with Sir Michael Biddulph a former surety for Morgan Whitley Receiver General for Cheshire and North Wales.	3 & 4 Ann. c. 19 Pr.	14 March 1705
An Act to empower the Lord High Treasurer, or Commissioners of the Treasury, to compound with Sir Michael Biddulph Baronet, as he was One of the Sureties for Morgan Whitley Esquire, Receiver General for the Counties of Chester and North Wales.
Settling Frankton (Warwickshire) tithes upon Simon Biddulph and a rentcharge in lieu upon the present rector and his successors.	3 & 4 Ann. c. 20 Pr.	14 March 1705
An Act for settling of the Tithes of certain Lands, in Franckton, in the County of Warwick, upon Simon Biddulph Esquire and his Heirs; and for settling a Rent Charge, in Lieu thereof, upon the present Rector there, and his Successors for ever.
Augmentation of Gainsborough (Lincolnshire) Vicarage.	3 & 4 Ann. c. 21 Pr.	14 March 1705
An Act for the Augmentation of the Vicarage of Gainsborough, in the County of Lincolne.
Empowering the Treasury to compound with Thomas Whitley a former surety for Morgan Whitley late Receiver General for Cheshire and North Wales.	3 & 4 Ann. c. 22 Pr.	14 March 1705
An Act to empower the Lord High Treasurer, or Commissioners of the Treasury, to compound with Thomas Whitley Esquire, as he was One of the Sureties of Morgan Whitley Esquire, late Receiver General for the Counties of Chester and North Wales.
Scudamore's Estate Act 1704	3 & 4 Ann. c. 23 Pr.	14 March 1705
An Act for Sale of the Estate of Ambrose Scudamore Esquire, deceased, for Payment of the Mortgage-money and Debts thereupon; and placing out the Overplus-money to the Uses therein mentioned.
Estates of Mathew Lister and Timothy Whitfield and their wives: sale of lands in Heston (Middlesex) for purposes mentioned.	3 & 4 Ann. c. 24 Pr.	14 March 1705
An Act for Sale of certain Lands and Tenements, in Heston, in the County of Midd'x, late the Estate of Mathew Lister and his Wife, and Timothy Whitfield and his Wife, for the Purposes therein mentioned.
Enabling James Lockhart and his wife to sell lands in Essex formerly belonging to Sir Thomas Luckin for payment of their debts, and to purchase other lands to be settled to the same uses.	3 & 4 Ann. c. 25 Pr.	14 March 1705
An Act to enable James Lockhart Esquire and his Wife to sell certain Lands, Tenements, and Hereditaments, in the County of Essex, late of Sir Thomas Luckin Baronet, deceased, for Payment of their Debts; and to purchase other Lands with the Overplus of the Money, to be settled to the like Uses.
Mortgage of a plantation in Barbados for payment of Robert Hooper's debts.	3 & 4 Ann. c. 26 Pr.	14 March 1705
An Act for raising Money, by a Mortgage of a Plantation in The Barbadoes, to pay the Debts of Robert Hooper.
Baines' Estate Act 1704	3 & 4 Ann. c. 27 Pr.	14 March 1705
An Act for Sale of Part of the Estate of Edward Baines Gentleman, for Discharge of a Mortgage thereupon, and making Provision for his Daughters.
Horne and Bletchingley Parishes Act 1704	3 & 4 Ann. c. 28 Pr.	14 March 1705
An Act for severing and disuniting the Church or Chapel of Horne (Note: Horne, Surrey) from the Church of Blechingley, (Note: Bletchingley) in the County of Surrey.
Enabling trustees to raise money to pay Mark Delves's debts.	3 & 4 Ann. c. 29 Pr.	14 March 1705
An Act to enable Trustees to raise Money, to pay the Debts of Mark Delves Esquire, deceased.
Estate of Thomas Goddard of Rudlow (Wiltshire): sale of lands for the payment of debts and for settling residue on Ambrose Goddard.	3 & 4 Ann. c. 30 Pr.	14 March 1705
An Act for Sale of several Lands, late of Thomas Goddard, of Rudlow, in the County of Wilts, Esquire, deceased, for Payment of his Debts; and for settling the Overplus upon Ambrose Goddard, for the Purposes therein mentioned.
Nodes' Estate Act 1704	3 & 4 Ann. c. 31 Pr.	14 March 1705
An Act for Sale of several Lands and Hereditaments of George Nodes Esquire, in the County of Hertford, for Payment of his Debts, and the Debts of George Nodes Esquire, his Father, deceased, charged thereupon.
Hinxman's Estate Act 1704	3 & 4 Ann. c. 32 Pr.	14 March 1705
An Act to enable Joseph Hinxman, of North Hinton, in the County of Southampton, Esquire, to sell some Estates in Andover, in the said County; and for the settling other Estates, in Christchurch Twyneham, in the said County, of a better Value, to the same Uses.
Crowe's Estate Act 1704	3 & 4 Ann. c. 33 Pr.	14 March 1705
An Act for Sale of several Lands, in the Counties of Durham and Northumberland, late of Patricius Crowe Esquire, deceased, for the raising the Portions charged thereupon for his Younger Children.
Burr's Estate Act 1704	3 & 4 Ann. c. 34 Pr.	14 March 1705
An Act for vesting an Estate mortgaged in Fee, by Thomas Burr, to Anthony Tomkins (now an Infant), in Trustees, to re-convey the same to the said Thomas Burr, or as he shall appoint, upon Payment of all the Monies due on the said Mortgage.
Confirmation of and making good Hugh Nanney's will.	3 & 4 Ann. c. 35 Pr.	14 March 1705
An Act for confirming and making good the last Will and Testament of Hugh Nanney Esquire, deceased.
Empowering the Treasury to compound with John Mason, former Receiver General for the county, university and town of Cambridge and Isle of Ely, and with John Silkman one of his sureties.	3 & 4 Ann. c. 36 Pr.	14 March 1705
An Act to empower the Lord High Treasurer, or Commissioners of the Treasury, to compound with John Mason Gentleman, who was Receiver General for the County, University, and Town of Cambridge, and Isle of Ely; and also with John Pickering Silkman, One of the said John Mason's Sureties, as he was such Receiver.
Bludworth's Estate Act 1704	3 & 4 Ann. c. 37 Pr.	14 March 1705
An Act for Sale of the Estate of Charles Bludworth Esquire, deceased, for Payment of his Debts.
Guy's Estate Act 1704	3 & 4 Ann. c. 38 Pr.	14 March 1705
An Act for vesting the Estate late of Thomas Guy Gentleman, deceased, in Trustees, to be sold, for the Payment of his Debts.
Proctor's Estate Act 1704	3 & 4 Ann. c. 39 Pr.	14 March 1705
An Act to enable John Proctor, of Rock, in the County of Northumberland, Esquire, to sell or otherwise dispose of his Lands, in Shawdon, Shawdon Woodhouse, and Crawley, upon settling Lands of like Value, in the said County, in Lieu thereof.
Sands' Estate Act 1704	3 & 4 Ann. c. 40 Pr.	14 March 1705
An Act for Sale of Part of the Estate of John Sands Esquire, in the County of Surrey, for Payment of his Debts, and raising a Portion for his Daughter.
Ball's Estate Act 1704	3 & 4 Ann. c. 41 Pr.	14 March 1705
An Act for Sale of the Estate of Richard Ball, in Little Appleby and Great Appleby, in the Counties of Derby and Leicester; and for laying out so much of the Money as will purchase another Estate, of equal Value, to be settled to the same Uses; and the Residue in making Provision for Younger Children.
Enabling Edmond Waller to charge his estate with payment of his debts.	3 & 4 Ann. c. 42 Pr.	14 March 1705
An Act to enable Edmund Waller Esquire to charge his Estate (not settled upon his Wife in Jointure) with a Sum of Money, for Payment of his Debts.
Hatcher's Estate Act 1704	3 & 4 Ann. c. 43 Pr.	14 March 1705
An Act for raising Money, for Payment of the Debts of Thomas Hatcher Esquire, by Sale or Mortgage of some Part of his Estate; and for the better Execution of several Powers in his Marriage Settlement.
Green's Estates Act 1704	3 & 4 Ann. c. 44 Pr.	14 March 1705
An Act to enable John Green, of Gavellacre, in the County of Southampton, Clerk, to sell some Estates in Hackleston, in the County of Wilts; and for the settling other Estates, in Gavellacre, in the County of Southampton, of a better Value, to the same Uses.
Naturalization of Margarita Cadogan, Gilbert Alfleck and John Louis.	3 & 4 Ann. c. 45 Pr.	14 March 1705
An Act to naturalize Margarita Cecilia Cadogan, Wife of Brigadier General Cadogan, Gilbert Alfleck, and John Herman Louis.
Griffin's Estate Act 1704	3 & 4 Ann. c. 46 Pr.	14 March 1705
An Act for enabling Trustees to make Leases of Part of the Manor of Dingley, and Lands there, for Payment of the Debts of James Griffin Esquire, and raising Portions for Younger Children.
Trafford's Estate Act 1704	3 & 4 Ann. c. 47 Pr.	14 March 1705
An Act for the better Explanation of the Settlement of the Estate of William Trafford Gentleman and Clare his Wife, and William their Eldest Son; and for making more effectual a Provision for Younger Children, according to Agreements between them.
Lenthal's Estate Act 1704	3 & 4 Ann. c. 48 Pr.	14 March 1705
An Act for vesting the Equity of Redemption of the Manor and Capital Messuage of Latchford, with the Appurtenances, and divers Freehold Messuages, Farms, and Lands, in Latchford and Hasely, in the County of Oxon, late the Estate of William Lenthail Esquire, deceased, in Trustees, to be sold, for discharging of Incumbrances thereupon.
Cavendish's Estate Act 1704	3 & 4 Ann. c. 49 Pr.	14 March 1705
An Act to enable William Cavendish Esquire to make a Settlement in Jointure upon any Wife he shall marry; and for the better raising the Portions charged upon his Estate; and for confirming Enfranchisements of several Copyhold Estates made by his Father, within the Manor of Dovebridge, in the Counties of Stafford and Derby.
Enabling Sir George Warburton to sell the manor of Pulford (Cheshire) for payment of portions according to his marriage agreement and his father's debts.	3 & 4 Ann. c. 50 Pr.	14 March 1705
An Act to enable Sir George Warburton Baronet to sell the Manor or Lordship of Pulford, in the County of Chester, to perform an Agreement made upon his Marriage, for Payment of several Portions charged upon his Estate; and also to pay some Debts which his Father had Power to charge.
Pince's Estate Act 1704	3 & 4 Ann. c. 51 Pr.	14 March 1705
An Act for Sale of several Lands and Chattelestates, in the County of Devon, and City and County of Exon, of Joseph Pince, for Payment of his Debts and Legacies charged upon his Estate; and for a Provision for himself, his Wife and Family.
Naturalization of Andrew Girardot or Devermenoux, Francis Buzelin and others.	3 & 4 Ann. c. 52 Pr.	14 March 1705
An Act to naturalize Andrew Girardot, alias Devermenoux, Francis Buzelin, and others.
Tyrrell's Estate Act 1704	3 & 4 Ann. c. 53 Pr.	14 March 1705
An Act to make some Alteration and Amendments in an Act of Parliament obtained the last Session, (Note: Sir Peter and Thomas Tyrrell's Estate Act 1703 (2 & 3 Ann. 30 Pr.)) by Sir Peter Tyrrill and Thomas Tyrrill his Son, in order to enable them to sell several Lands in Hanslopp and Castletbropp, in the County of Bucks, which were settled upon the Marriage of the said Thomas Tyrril and Dorothy his Wife, and to settle other Lands in Lieu thereof.
May's Estate Act 1704	3 & 4 Ann. c. 54 Pr.	14 March 1705
An Act for Sale of Part of the Estate of Baptist May Esquire, deceased, for reimbursing Charles May Esquire, his Nephew, such Monies as he has expended, for discharging the Debts, Legacies, and Funeral Expences, of the said Baptist May.
Holford's Estate Act 1704	3 & 4 Ann. c. 55 Pr.	14 March 1705
An Act for Sale of the Estate of Thomas Holford Esquire, in Plumbly and elsewhere, in the County of Chester, consisting chiefly in Reversions, to raise Money, for Payment of his Debts, and purchasing an Estate in Possession, to be settled to the same Uses as the other Estate was settled.
Confirmation of lease of lands in Epsom by Sir Joseph Sheldon and Sir James Edwards to Humphrey Bean and agreed to be assigned to Sir Thomas Cooke, and enabling other lands adjoining to be leased to him.	3 & 4 Ann. c. 56 Pr.	14 March 1705
An Act for confirming a Lease heretofore made of certain Messuages and Lands in Epsam, by Sir Joseph Shelden and Sir James Edwards, to Humphry Bean, and agreed to be assigned to Sir Thomas Cooke Knight; and for enabling a Lease of other Lands adjoining to the same to be made to him.
Sir Thomas and his son John Worsop's estate in Finsbury Fields or Moorfields in the parish of Shoreditch (Middlesex): sale for payment of debts and legacies and purchase of another in Ireland.	3 & 4 Ann. c. 57 Pr.	14 March 1705
An Act for vesting in Trustees the Estate late of Sir Thomas Worsopp Knight, and John Worsopp Esquire his Son, deceased, in Finsbury Fields and Moorfields, in the Parish of Shoreditch, in the County of Middl'x, to be sold, for the Payment of Debts and Legacies; and the Overplus of the Money remaining, to be laid out for the purchasing of Messuages, Lands, Tenements, or Hereditaments of Inheritance, in the Kingdom of Ireland, to be settled as in the Act is particularly mentioned.
Empowering the Treasury to compound with Thomas Kenyon executor of Luke Lloyd formerly a surety of Morgan Whitley formerly Receiver General for Cheshire and North Wales.	3 & 4 Ann. c. 58 Pr.	14 March 1705
An Act to empower the Lord High Treasurer, or Commissioners of the Treasury, to compound with Thomas Kenyon, Executor of Luke Lloyd Esquire, as he was One of the Sureties of Morgan Whitley Esquire, late Receiver General for the Counties of Chester and North Wales.
Grainge's Estate Act 1704	3 & 4 Ann. c. 59 Pr.	14 March 1705
An Act for vesting the Estate of Joseph Grainge and Elizabeth his Wife in Trustees, to be sold; and to dispose of Part of the Money arising by such Sale, for the Maintenance of the said Elizabeth, pursuant to their Marriage Settlement; and to apply the Residue to the Payment of the Debts of the said Joseph Grainge.
Lister's Estate Act 1704	3 & 4 Ann. c. 60 Pr.	14 March 1705
An Act to enable Trustees to sell such Part of the Estate of Richard Lister Esquire and Frances Pate Lister his Wife, sole Daughter and Heir of Sir Thomas Smith Baronet, deceased, in the County of Chester and City of Chester, as remains unsold, in order to raise Money, for the Payment of the Debts of the said Sir Thomas Smith, and for Portions for Younger Children of the said Frances Pate Lister; and for applying the Overplus in the Purchase of other Lands, to be settled for confirming such Leases and Sales as have been made towards Discharge of the said Debts.
Empowering the Treasury to compound with Michael Wicks late Receiver General of the Plantation Duties in the Port of London.	3 & 4 Ann. c. 61 Pr.	14 March 1705
An Act to empower the Lord High Treasurer, or Commissioners of the Treasury, to compound with Michael Wicks Esquire, late Receiver General of the Plantation Duties in the Port of London.

=== Sources ===
- Raithby, John, ed. (1963) [1821]. "3° & 4° Annæ". Statutes of the Realm. Vol. 8: The Statutes of the First to the Sixth Years of the Reign of Queen Anne (1702–1707). London: Dawsons. pp. 306–381 – via HathiTrust.
- Pickering, Danby, ed. (1764). "Anno tertio & quarto Annæ". The Statutes at Large. Vol. 11: From the Second to the Eighth Year of Queen Anne. Cambridge: Joseph Bentham. pp. 62–116 – via Internet Archive.
- Pickering, Danby, ed. (1764). "Anno tertio & quarto Annæ". The Statutes at Large. Vol. 11: From the Second to the Eighth Year of Queen Anne. Cambridge: Joseph Bentham. pp. 62–116 – via Internet Archive.
- Journals of the House of Commons. Vol. 14. London: His Majesty's Stationery Office. 1803. pp. 390–578 – via Google Books.
- Chronological Table of and Index to the Statutes. Vol. 1: To the End of the Session 59 Vict. Sess. 2 (1895) (13th ed.). London: Her Majesty's Stationery Office. 1896. p. 84 – via Google Books.
- "Chronological Tables of the Private and Personal Acts: Part 6 (1702–1705)". legislation.gov.uk. The National Archives.

== See also ==
- List of acts of the Parliament of England
