= Continuance of Laws Act 1702 =

Act of the Parliament of England

- Act of Parliament
- Parliament of England
- Long title: An Act for continuing former Acts, for exporting Leather, and for Ease of Jurors; and for reviving and making more effectual an Act relating to Vagrants.
- Citation: 1 Ann. St. 2. c. 13
- Territorial extent: England and Wales

Dates
- Royal assent: 27 February 1703
- Commencement: 8 March 1702 (Note: Start of session.)
- Repealed: 15 July 1867

Other legislation
- Amends: Exportation Act 1667; Juries Act 1695; Vagrancy Act 1698
- Amended by: Vagrants Act 1706
- Repealed by: Statute Law Revision Act 1867
- Relates to: Trade Act 1685; Exportation (Leather) Act 1688; See Expiring laws continuance acts

Status: Repealed

Text of statute as originally enacted

The Continuance of Laws Act 1702 (1 Ann. St. 2. c. 13) was an act of the Parliament of England that revived and continued various older acts.

== Background ==
In the United Kingdom, acts of Parliament remain in force until expressly repealed. Many acts of parliament, however, contained time-limited sunset clauses, requiring legislation to revive enactments that had expired or to continue enactments that would otherwise expire.

== Provisions ==
Section 1 of the act continued the Exportation Act 1667 (19 & 20 Cha. 2. c. 10), as revived by the Trade Act 1685 (1 Ja. 2. c. 13), revived and continued by the Exportation (Leather) Act 1688 (1 Will. & Mar. c. 23) and continued by the Continuance of Laws Act 1695 (7 & 8 Will. 3. c. 36), until the end of the first session of parliament after 7 years from the end of the present session of parliament.

Section 2 of the act continued the Juries Act 1695 (7 & 8 Will. 3. c. 32) until the end of the next session of parliament after 7 years from 1 May 1703.

Section 3 of the act provided that no person with estates of the clear yearly value of £150 or greater shall be returned to serve on juries at Sessions of the Peace in the County of York, with a penalty of £20 to be forfeited by any Sheriff or officer making such a return or summons.

Section 4 of the act continued the Vagrancy Act 1698 (11 Will. 3. c. 18) until the end of the next session of parliament after 3 years from 24 June 1703.

Section 5 of the act provided that the Vagrancy Act 1698 (11 Will. 3. c. 18) would extend to all vagrants, with or without passes.

Section 6 of the act provided that Justices of the Peace at the first Quarter Sessions and yearly at every Easter Sessions were empowered and required to set rates for maintaining and conveying vagrants through their respective counties, with clerks required to provide free copies of these rates to each Justice to regulate allowances taxed on certificates given to petty constables.

Section 7 of the act provided that no Chief or High Constable shall pay the rates taxed upon certificates brought to them unless they are presented with a receipt from the constables of adjacent counties confirming the delivery of the vagrants as ordered.

Section 8 of the act provided that any Chief Constable, Petty Constable, or other officer who refuses or neglects their duties required by the act shall forfeit the sum of 20s for each offense.

== Subsequent developments ==
So much of the act as relates to vagrants was continued until the end of the next session of parliament after 7 years from the expiration of those enactments by section 1 of the Vagrants Act 1706 (6 Ann. c. 32) (Note: This is the citation in The Statutes of the Realm.).

The Select Committee on Temporary Laws, Expired or Expiring, appointed in 1796, inspected and considered all temporary laws, observing irregularities in the construction of expiring laws continuance acts, making recommendations and emphasising the importance of the Committee for Expired and Expiring Laws.

The whole act was repealed by section 1 of, and the schedule to, the Statute Law Revision Act 1867 (30 & 31 Vict. c. 59), which came into force on 15 July 1867.
