= Faggot voter =

Hireling eligible to vote as nominal titleholder of part of a subdivided property

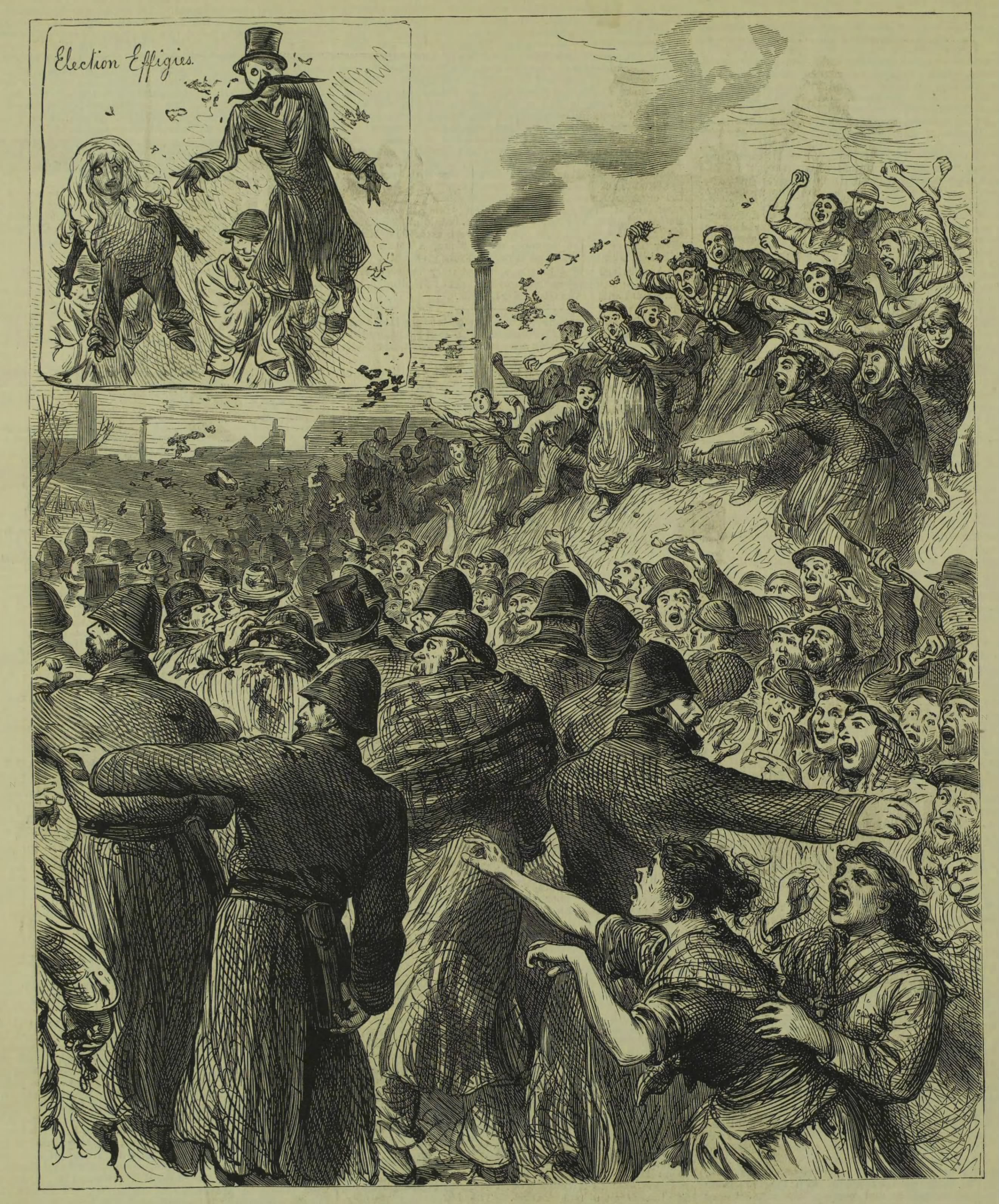
A drawing depicting a procession of faggot voters during the 1880 United Kingdom general election.

A faggot voter or faggot was a person who qualified to vote in an election with a restricted suffrage only by the exploitation of loopholes in the regulations. Typically, faggot voters satisfied a property qualification by holding the title to a subdivision of a large property with a single beneficial owner. Faggot voting was a common electoral abuse in the United Kingdom until the electoral reforms of the late 19th century.

== Etymology ==
The word faggot originally meant a piece or bundle of gathered firewood. It was later applied to civilians added to a military muster roll purely to make up the numbers rather than to serve as soldiers. The extension from muster rolls to electoral rolls is attested from 1817.

== Practices ==
In the unreformed House of Commons, and for decades after the Reform Act 1832, voting in a geographical constituency was restricted to those with an "interest" (i.e. property) in the constituency, generally in the form of real estate. If a landowner subdivided a single property into multiple units, and transferred the title of each unit into the name of a separate person, each titleholder could then register to vote. These "faggot voters" were expected to vote according to the wishes of the original landowner; the lack of secret ballot ensured they complied with the landowner's wishes. Prohibition of vote buying was difficult to enforce if the faggot was an employee of the landowner. There was no requirement for a voter to be resident; the landowner and faggot voter might both reside outside the constituency.

Although the original forty shilling freehold suffrage of 1432 applied to freehold rather than leasehold, it had been widened gradually over the centuries, increasing the number of loopholes by which faggot voters might register. Edward Porritt found the earliest instances of faggot voting in the 1620s under Charles I. The Parliamentary Elections Act 1695 (7 & 8 Will. 3. c. 25) prohibited subdivision of tenements for this purpose. In the 18th century, a freehold would be conveyed to the faggot just before the election, and back again straight after the vote.

The sheriffs of the City of London are elected by the liverymen of the livery companies. Richard Causton, himself an MP and liveryman, said in the debate on the Local Government Act 1888 that "anyone who wanted a vote could go down to the City with £12 in his pocket, and get the right to vote ... There were liverymen who had no connection with the City beyond the fact that they were faggot voters". His amendment to restrict the vote to "men who had business in the City of London" was defeated.

== Abolition ==
Subdivision of property other than to bona fide titleholders was prohibited for the franchise in borough constituencies by the Representation of the People Act 1867 and in county constituencies by the Representation of the People Act 1884. However, previously enrolled faggot voters retained their vote until death. This was rendered irrelevant by the Representation of the People Act 1918, which introduced manhood suffrage.

== See also ==
- Ballot stuffing
- Ghost voter
- Parliamentary franchise in the U.K. 1885–1918
- Prevention of electoral fraud
- Manhood suffrage
- Pocket borough
