= 1695 English general election =

General election in England

- October – November 1695

All 513 seats in the House of Commons 257 seats needed for a majority
	First party	Second party
Party	Whig	Tory
Seats won	257	203
Seat change	▲16	▼40
- Composition of the House of Commons after the election

The 1695 English general election was the first to be held under the terms of the Triennial Act 1694, which required parliament to be dissolved and fresh elections called at least every three years. This measure helped to fuel partisan rivalry over the coming decades, with the electorate in a constant state of excitement and the Whigs and Tories continually trying to gain the upper hand. Despite the potential for manipulation of the electorate, as was seen under Robert Walpole and his successors, with general elections held an average of every other year, and local and central government positions frequently changing hands between parties, it was impossible for any party or government to be certain of electoral success in the period after 1694, and election results were consequently genuinely representative of the views of at least the section of the population able to vote.

The election of 1695, however, was comparatively quiet, being fought mainly on local issues. The new government led by the Whig junto made gains in most contested constituencies, and their party was returned with a narrow majority. The junto's support was not certain, however, as their policies increasingly alienated backbench 'country' Whigs, who were willing to co-operate with the Tories, and the government frequently ran into trouble in the House of Commons. Eighty-five constituencies were contested, 31% of the total.

English Parliament of General Election 1695

Party strengths are an approximation, with many MPs' allegiances being unknown.

== Summary of the constituencies ==
See 1796 British general election for details. The constituencies used in England and Wales were the same throughout the period. In 1707 alone the 45 Scottish members were not elected from the constituencies, but were returned by co-option of a part of the membership of the last Parliament of Scotland elected before the Union.

== See also ==
- 3rd Parliament of King William III
- List of parliaments of England
