= List of acts of the Parliament of England from 1701 =

This is a list of acts of the Parliament of England for the year 1701.

For acts passed during the period 1707–1800, see the list of acts of the Parliament of Great Britain. See also the list of acts of the Parliament of Scotland, and the list of acts of the Parliament of Ireland.

For acts passed from 1801 onwards, see the list of acts of the Parliament of the United Kingdom. For acts of the devolved parliaments and assemblies in the United Kingdom, see the list of acts of the Scottish Parliament, the list of acts of the Northern Ireland Assembly, and the list of acts and measures of Senedd Cymru; see also the list of acts of the Parliament of Northern Ireland.

For medieval statutes, etc. that are not considered to be acts of Parliament, see the list of English statutes.

See also the List of ordinances and acts of the Parliament of England, 1642–1660 for ordinances and acts passed by the Long Parliament and other bodies without royal assent, and which were not considered to be valid legislation following the Restoration in 1660.

The number shown after each act's title is its chapter number. Acts are cited using this number, preceded by the years of the reign during which the relevant parliamentary session was held; thus the Union with Ireland Act 1800 is cited as "39 & 40 Geo. 3. c. 67", meaning the 67th act passed during the session that started in the 39th year of the reign of George III and which finished in the 40th year of that reign. The modern convention is to use Arabic numerals in citations (thus "41 Geo. 3" rather than "41 Geo. III"). Acts of the last session of the Parliament of Great Britain and the first session of the Parliament of the United Kingdom are both cited as "41 Geo. 3".

Acts passed by the Parliament of England did not have a short title; however, some of these acts have subsequently been given a short title by acts of the Parliament of the United Kingdom, such as the Short Titles Act 1896 (59 & 60 Vict. c. 14).

Acts passed by the Parliament of England were deemed to have come into effect on the first day of the session in which they were passed. Because of this, the years given in the list below may in fact be the year before a particular act was passed.

== 13 & 14 Will. 3 ==
The 6th Parliament of William III. From 30 December 1701 until the death of William III on 8 March 1702.

This session was also traditionally cited as 13 & 14 Gul. 3, 13 & 14 W. 3, 13 Will. (Ruffhead's Statutes at Large), 13 Gul. or 13 W.

=== Public acts ===
| Short title | Citation | Royal assent |
Long title
| Debts Due to the Army, etc. Act 1701 (repealed) | 13 & 14 Will. 3. c. 1 (Note: This is the citation in The Statutes of the Realm.); 13 Will. c. 1 (Note: This is the citation in the Statutes at Large.) | 10 February 1702 |
An Act for reviving and continuing an act, intituled, "An act for the appointing commissioners to take, examine, and determine the debts due to the army, navy, and for transport service, and also an account of prizes taken during the late war." (Note: The Nine Years' War.) (Note: Debts Due to the Army, etc. Act 1698 (11 Will. 3. c. 8)) (Repealed by Statute Law Revision Act 1867 (30 & 31 Vict. c. 59))
| Mutiny Act 1701 (repealed) | 13 & 14 Will. 3. c. 2; 13 Will. c. 2 | 2 March 1702 |
An Act for punishing of officers and soldiers, that shall mutiny or desert in England or Ireland. (Repealed by Statute Law Revision Act 1867 (30 & 31 Vict. c. 59))
| Correspondence with James the Pretender (High Treason) Act 1701 (repealed) | 13 & 14 Will. 3. c. 3; 13 Will. c. 3 | 2 March 1702 |
An Act for the Attainder of the pretended Prince of Wales (Note: James Francis Edward Stuart.) of High Treason. (Repealed by Statute Law Revision Act 1948 (11 & 12 Geo. 6. c. 62))
| Affirmation by Quakers Act 1701 (repealed) | 13 & 14 Will. 3. c. 4; 13 Will. c. 4 | 2 March 1702 |
An Act for continuing an act, intituled, "An Act that the Solemne Affirmation & Declaration of the People called Quakers shall be accepted instead of an Oath in the usual form." (Note: Quakers Act 1695 (7 & 8 Will. 3. c. 34)) (Repealed by Statute Law Revision Act 1867 (30 & 31 Vict. c. 59))
| Taxation Act 1701 (repealed) | 13 & 14 Will. 3. c. 5; 13 Will. c. 5 | 7 March 1702 |
An Act for granting an aid to his Majesty, by laying duties upon malt, mum, cyder and perry. (Repealed by Statute Law Revision Act 1867 (30 & 31 Vict. c. 59))
| Security of the Succession, etc. Act 1701 (repealed) | 13 & 14 Will. 3. c. 6; 13 Will. c. 6 | 7 March 1702 |
An Act for the further security of his Majesty's person, and the succession of the crown in the protestant line, and for extinguishing the hopes of the pretended Prince of Wales, and all other pretenders, and their open and secret abettors. (Repealed by Statute Law Revision Act 1867 (30 & 31 Vict. c. 59))

=== Private acts ===
| Short title | Citation | Royal assent |
Long title
| Boscowen's Naturalization Act 1701 | 13 & 14 Will. 3. c. 1 Pr. (Note: This is the citation in The Statutes of the Realm.); 13 Will. c. 1 Pr. (Note: This is the citation in the Statutes at Large.) | 2 March 1702 |
An Act for naturalizing Charlotte the Wife of Hugh Boscawen Esquire.
| Earl of Orrery's Estate Act 1701 | 13 & 14 Will. 3. c. 2 Pr. 13 Will. c. 2 Pr. | 7 March 1702 |
An Act for enabling Lionel Earl of Orrery, in the Kingdom of Ireland, by Sale of certain Lands and Tenements, to raise Money, for Payment of his Debts; and settle other Lands to the Uses and Purposes in this Act mentioned.

=== Sources ===
- Raithby, John, ed. (1963) [1820]. "13° & 14° Gul. III.". Statutes of the Realm. Vol. 7: The Statutes of King William III (1695–1701). London: Dawsons. pp. 731–750 – via HathiTrust.
- Raithby, John, ed. (1820). Statutes of the Realm. Vol. 7: 1696-1701 – via British History Online.
- Pickering, Danby, ed. (1764). "Anno decimo tertio Gulielmi III". The Statutes at Large. Vol. 10: From the Eighth Year of King William III to the Second Year of Queen Anne. Cambridge: Joseph Bentham. pp. 397–406 – via Internet Archive.
- Journals of the House of Commons. Vol. 13. London: His Majesty's Stationery Office. 1803. pp. 645–782 – via Google Books.
- Chronological Table of and Index to the Statutes. Vol. 1: To the End of the Session 59 Vict. Sess. 2 (1895) (13th ed.). London: Her Majesty's Stationery Office. 1896. p. 82 – via Google Books.
- "Chronological Tables of the Private and Personal Acts: Part 5 (1695–1701)". legislation.gov.uk. The National Archives.

== See also ==
- List of acts of the Parliament of England
