= Vagrants Act 1706 =

Act of the Parliament of England

- Act of Parliament
- Parliament of England
- Long title: An Act for the Continuance of the Laws for the Punishment of Vagrants; and for making such Laws more effectual.
- Citation: 6 Ann. c. 32 (Note: This is the citation in The Statutes of the Realm.); 5 Ann. c. 32 (Note: This is the citation in The Statutes at Large.)
- Territorial extent: England and Wales

Dates
- Royal assent: 8 April 1707
- Commencement: 3 December 1706 (Note: Start of session.)
- Repealed: 15 July 1867

Other legislation
- Amends: Vagrancy Act 1698; Continuance of Laws Act 1702
- Repealed by: Statute Law Revision Act 1867
- Relates to: Continuance of Laws Act 1706

Status: Repealed

Text of statute as originally enacted

The Vagrants Act 1706 (6 Ann. c. 32) was an act of the Parliament of England that continued and amended the Vagrancy Act 1698 (11 Will. 3 c. 18).

== Provisions ==
Section 1 of the act continued the Vagrancy Act 1698 (11 Will. 3 c. 18), as amended and continued by the Continuance of Laws Act 1702 (1 Ann. St. 2. c. 13) and relating to vagrants, until the end of the next session of parliament after 7 years from the expiration of the act.

Section 2 of the act provided that Justices of Peace could assess towns, parishes, or places within their jurisdictions for reasonable sums of money to compensate constables and others for their time and expenses in dealing with vagrants, with these funds to be collected according to rules prescribed for county bridge repairs.

Section 3 of the act provided that when a county, riding, liberty, or division had two or more treasurers, they were obligated to obey orders made by Justices of Peace at their quarterly sessions regarding the disbursement of funds arising from vagrant conveyance, with charges to be levied according to customary rates of goal or bridge money.

Section 4 of the act provided that any person aggrieved by demands for disbursements charged by constables, headboroughs, or tythingmen could appeal to the Justices at their next General Quarter Sessions, whose judgment would be final and binding on all parties.

Section 5 of the act provided that justices, chief magistrates, treasurers, constables and other officers in liberties and towns corporate shall certify and convey passengers, vagabonds, beggars and other idle persons, and raise money in these jurisdictions as if they were acting in counties at large.

== Subsequent developments ==
The whole act was repealed by section 1 of, and the schedule to, the Statute Law Revision Act 1867 (30 & 31 Vict. c. 59), which came into force on 15 July 1867.
