= Mutiny Act 1703 =

Act of the Parliament of England

- Act of Parliament
- Parliament of England
- Long title: An Act for punishing Mutiny, Desertion, and false Musters; and for better paying of the Army and Quarters, and for satisfying divers Arrears; and for a further Continuance of the Powers of the Five Commissioners for examining and determining the Accompts of the Army.
- Citation: 2 & 3 Ann. c. 17 (Note: This is the citation in The Statutes of the Realm.); 2 & 3 Ann. c. 20 (Note: This is the citation in The Statutes at Large.)
- Territorial extent: England and Wales

Dates
- Royal assent: 3 April 1704
- Commencement: 9 November 1703 (Note: Start of session.)
- Repealed: 15 July 1867
Other legislation
Repealed by	Statute Law Revision Act 1867
Relates to	Correspondence with Enemies Act 1691; Correspondence with Enemies Act 1704

Status: Repealed

Text of statute as originally enacted

The Mutiny Act 1703 (2 & 3 Ann. c. 17) was an act of the Parliament of England. Although as one of the Mutiny Acts its main purpose was to provide for the punishment of mutiny in the English Army and Royal Navy and other provisions for regulating the armed forces, it differed from other Mutiny Acts by providing (in section 34) for a new species of treason, which was committed by any officer or soldier who corresponded with any rebel or enemy without a licence to do so from the queen or from a general, lieutenant-general or "chief commander." Section 43 expressly provided that a defendant charged with that offence was to have the benefit of the safeguards in the Treason Act 1695 (7 & 8 Will. 3. c. 3).

== Subsequent developments ==
The whole act was repealed by section 1 of, and the schedule to, the Statute Law Revision Act 1867 (30 & 31 Vict. c. 59).

== See also ==
- Correspondence with Enemies Act 1691
- High treason in the United Kingdom
- Treason Act
