= Correspondence with Enemies Act 1691 =

Act of the Parliament of England

- Act of Parliament
- Parliament of England
- Long title: An Act against corresponding with Their Majesties Enemies.
- Citation: 3 Will. & Mar. c. 13
- Territorial extent: England and Wales

Dates
- Royal assent: 24 February 1692
- Commencement: 22 October 1691 (Note: Start of session.)
- Repealed: 15 July 1867
Other legislation
Amended by	Correspondence with the Pretender Act 1697
Repealed by	Statute Law Revision Act 1867
Relates to	Security of King and Government Act 1695; Correspondence with the Pretender Act 1697; Correspondence with James the Pretender (High Treason) Act 1701; Mutiny Act 1703; Correspondence with Enemies Act 1704; Treason Act 1708; Treason Act 1743

Status: Repealed

Text of statute as originally enacted

Correspondence with Enemies Act 1704
- Act of Parliament
- Parliament of England
- Long title: An Act to prevent all traiterous Correspondence with Her Majesty's Enemies.
- Citation: 3 & 4 Ann. c. 13 (Note: This is the citation in The Statutes of the Realm.); 3 & 4 Ann. c. 14 (Note: This is the citation in The Statutes at Large.)
- Territorial extent: England and Wales

Dates
- Royal assent: 14 March 1705
- Commencement: 25 March 1705 (Note: Section 1.)
- Repealed: 15 July 1867
Other legislation
Repealed by	Statute Law Revision Act 1867
Relates to	Correspondence with Enemies Act 1691; Security of King and Government Act 1695; Correspondence with the Pretender Act 1697; Correspondence with James the Pretender (High Treason) Act 1701; Mutiny Act 1703; Treason Act 1743

Status: Repealed

Text of statute as originally enacted

The Correspondence with Enemies Act 1691 (3 Will. & Mar. c. 13) was an act of the Parliament of England which made it high treason to correspond with the deposed King James II. It was replaced by the Correspondence with the Pretender Act 1697 (9 Will. 3. c. 1).

After James's death, the Correspondence with James the Pretender (High Treason) Act 1701 (13 & 14 Will. 3. c. 3) and the Correspondence with Enemies Act 1704 (3 & 4 Ann. c. 13) made it treason to correspond with his son, and the Treason Act 1743 (17 Geo. 2. c. 39) made it treason to correspond with his son's sons.

== Subsequent developments ==
The whole act was repealed by section 1 of, and the schedule to, the Statute Law Revision Act 1867 (30 & 31 Vict. c. 59), which came into force on 15 July 1867.

== See also ==
- Jacobitism
- High treason in the United Kingdom
- Mutiny Act 1703
