= Treason Act 1743 =

Act of the Parliament of Great Britain

- Act of Parliament
- Parliament of Great Britain
- Long title: An Act to make it High Treason to hold correspondence with the Sons of the Pretender to His Majesty's Crown, and for attainting them of High Treason, in case they should land or attempt to land in Great Britain, or any of the Dominions thereunto belonging, and for suspending the operation and effect of a Clause in the Act of the seventh year of the late Queen Anne, for improving the Union of the two Kingdoms, relating to Forfeitures for High Treason until after the decease of the sons of the Pretender.
- Citation: 17 Geo. 2. c. 39
- Territorial extent: Great Britain

Dates
- Royal assent: 12 May 1744
- Commencement: 1 May 1744 (Note: Section 1.)
- Repealed: 15 July 1867
Other legislation
| Amends | Treason Act 1708 |
| Amended by | Forfeiture upon Attainder of Treason Act 1799 |
| Repealed by | Statute Law Revision Act 1867 |
| Relates to | Correspondence with Enemies Act 1691; Correspondence with the Pretender Act 1697; Correspondence with James the Pretender (High Treason) Act 1701; Correspondence with Enemies Act 1704 |

Status: Repealed

Text of statute as originally enacted

The Treason Act 1743 (17 Geo. 2. c. 39) was an act of the Parliament of Great Britain which made it high treason to correspond with any of the sons of James Francis Edward Stuart ("The Old Pretender"), who claimed to be king of Great Britain and of Ireland. His sons were Charles Edward Stuart ("The Young Pretender") and Henry Benedict Stuart (who, after his elder brother's death in 1788, never asserted a claim to the throne).

== Provisions ==
Section 1 of the act enacted that after 1 May 1744 it was treason for anyone to "hold, entertain, or keep any intelligence or correspondence in person, or by letters, messages or otherwise" with any son of the Old Pretender, or any of his employees, "knowing such person to be so employed," or to give them money, whether in Great Britain or elsewhere.

Section 2 of the act provided that from the same date, any son of the Old Pretender who landed or attempted to land in Great Britain or Ireland, "or any of the dominions or territories belonging to the crown of Great Britain," or who was found there or in any ship with intent to land there, would be guilty of treason.

Forfeiture upon Attainder of Treason Act 1799
- Act of Parliament
- Parliament of Great Britain
- Long title: An act to repeal so much of an act, passed in the seventh year of the reign of Queen Anne, and also so much of an act passed in the seventeenth year of the reign of his late majesty King George the Second, as puts an end to the forfeiture of inheritances upon attainder of treason, after the death of the pretender and his sons.
- Citation: 39 Geo. 3. c. 93
- Territorial extent: Great Britain

Dates
- Royal assent: 12 July 1799
- Commencement: 12 July 1799 (Note: The Acts of Parliament (Commencement) Act 1793.)
- Repealed: 21 August 1871
Other legislation
| Amends | Treason Act 1708; Treason Act 1743 |
| Repealed by | Statute Law Revision Act 1871 |

Status: Repealed

Text of statute as originally enacted

Section 3 of the act amended section 10 of the Treason Act 1708 (7 Ann. c. 21). This section had originally provided that after the death of the Old Pretender, "no attainder for treason shall extend to the disinheriting of any heir, nor to the prejudice of the right or title of any person or persons, other than the right or title of the offender or offenders, during his, her, or their natural lives, only..." (See corruption of blood.) The 1743 Act postponed the operation of this clause until after the death of all of the Old Pretender's sons (which occurred in 1807), instead of his own death (in 1766). (The 1708 and 1743 acts were amended in turn by the Forfeiture upon Attainder of Treason Act 1799 (39 Geo. 3. c. 93), which repealed these provisions.)

Section 4 of the act stated that offences committed out of Great Britain could be tried anywhere in Great Britain.

== Previous legislation ==
Four previous statutes had made similar provision in respect of the Old Pretender and his father, the late King James:

- Correspondence with Enemies Act 1691
- Correspondence with the Pretender Act 1697
- Correspondence with James the Pretender (High Treason) Act 1701
- Correspondence with Enemies Act 1704

== Subsequent developments ==
The whole act was repealed by section 1 of, and the schedule to, the Statute Law Revision Act 1867 (30 & 31 Vict. c. 59), which came into force on 15 July 1867.

== See also ==
- Jacobitism
- High treason in the United Kingdom
- Treason Act
