= Parliamentary Elections Act 1695 =

Act of the Parliament of England

Parliamentary Elections Act 1695 (Note: The citation of this act by this short title was authorised by section 5 of, and the second schedule to, the Statute Law Revision Act 1948. Due to the repeal of those provisions, it is now authorised by section 19(2) of the Interpretation Act 1978.)
- Act of Parliament
- Parliament of England
- Long title: An Act for the further regulating Elections of Members to serve in Parliament and for the preventing irregular Proceedings of Sheriffs and other Officers in the electing and returning such Members. (Note: These words are printed against this act in the second column of the second schedule to the Statute Law Revision Act 1948, which is headed "Title".)
- Citation: 7 & 8 Will. 3. c. 25
- Territorial extent: England and Wales

Dates
- Royal assent: 10 April 1696
- Commencement: 22 November 1695 (Note: Start of session.)
Other legislation
Amended by	Parliamentary Elections Act 1793; Parliamentary Elections Act 1813; Statute Law Revision Act 1867; Sheriffs Act 1887; Statute Law Revision Act 1888; Representation of the People Act 1918; Parliament (Elections and Meeting) Act 1943; Representation of the People Act 1948; Electoral Administration Act 2006
Relates to	Parliamentary Elections (Returns) Act 1695; Reform Act 1832

Status: Partially repealed

Text of statute as originally enacted

Revised text of statute as amended

Text of the Parliamentary Elections Act 1695 as in force today (including any amendments) within the United Kingdom, from legislation.gov.uk.

The Parliamentary Elections Act 1695 (7 & 8 Will. 3. c. 25) is an act of the Parliament of England regulating elections to the English House of Commons.

As of 2026, the act remains in force in England and Wales.

== Provisions ==
Section 3 of the act required that an election to a county constituency had to take place at the county court, and that the court had to be held at the place where it had most often been held in the preceding forty years (in effect, at the county town). This was to prevent an electoral abuse where the county sheriff held the election at a place more convenient for voters favourable to one of the candidates.

Section 6 of the act sought to prevent faggot voters by requiring that a voter's forty shilling freehold was a bona fide holding and not a temporary conveyance.

Section 7 of the act established the minimum voting age and age of candidacy as 21, which was the age of majority under common law. Underage MPs were seldom unseated before the Reform Act 1832: Viscount Jocelyn was 18 in 1806.

Section 8 of the act provided that polling in Yorkshire, previously begun on a Monday, should instead begin on Wednesday. This was from a sabbatarian desire to prevent voters travelling on Sunday to the polling place.

Section 9 of the act provided that the poll for Hampshire would be taken first at Winchester and then, after an adjournment, at Newport for the convenience of voters on the Isle of Wight.

== Repeal ==
Some of the act was implicitly repealed by the Reform Act 1832 (2 & 3 Will. 4. c. 45).

Section 1 from "and shall forthwith" to end of that section, section 3 from "and shall there proceed to Election" to "Done or Election,", section 6 to "Mortgage or Trust," and section 9, of the act was repealed by section 1 of, and the schedule to, the Statute Law Revision Act 1867 (30 & 31 Vict. c. 59), which came into force on 15 July 1867..

Section 6 of the act was repealed by section 47(1) of, and the eighth schedule to, the Representation of the People Act 1918 (7 & 8 Geo. 5. c. 64), which came into force on 6 February 1918.

The whole act except section 7 was, and in section 7 the words from the beginning of the section to "any future parliament" where those words first occurred, was repealed by section 80(7) of, and the thirteenth schedule to, the Representation of the People Act 1948 (11 & 12 Geo. 6. c. 65), which came into force on 30 July 1948.

Section 7 of the act was repealed by sections 17(7)(a) and 74(2) of, and schedule 2 to, the Electoral Administration Act 2006, which came into force on 1 January 2007 in England and Wales and Scotland and 7 February 2007 in Northern Ireland.

The whole act was repealed for the Republic of Ireland by the Electoral Act 1963.

== Bibliography ==
- John Raithby, ed. (1820). "An Act for the further regulating Elections of Members to serve in Parliament and for the preventing irregular Proceedings of Sheriffs and other Officers in the electing and returning such Members.". William III, 1695-6: An Act for the further regulating Elections of Members to serve in Parliament and for the preventing irregular Proceedings of Sheriffs and other Officers... [Chapter XXV. Rot. Parl. 7 & 8 Gul. III. P. 5. N. 11.] | British History Online. Statutes of the Realm. Vol. 7: 1695-1701. History of Parliament Trust. pp. 109–111.
