= Trade with France Act 1704 =

Act of the Parliament of England

- Act of Parliament
- Parliament of England
- Long title: An Act for prohibiting all Trade and Commerce with France.
- Citation: 3 & 4 Ann. c. 12 (Note: This is the citation in The Statutes of the Realm.); 3 & 4 Ann. c. 13 (Note: This is the citation in The Statutes at Large.)
- Territorial extent: England and Wales

Dates
- Royal assent: 14 March 1705
- Commencement: 25 March 1705 (Note: Section 1.)
- Repealed: 15 July 1867
Other legislation
Repealed by	Statute Law Revision Act 1867

Status: Repealed

Text of statute as originally enacted

The Trade with France Act 1704 (3 & 4 Ann. c. 12) was an act of the Parliament of England that prohibited the importation of French goods into England. France and Spain were on opposite sides in the War of the Spanish Succession at the time.

== Subsequent developments ==
The whole act was repealed by section 1 of, and the schedule to, the Statute Law Revision Act 1867 (30 & 31 Vict. c. 59), which came into force on 15 July 1867.
