= Security of King and Government Act 1695 =

Act of the Parliament of England

- Act of Parliament
- Parliament of England
- Long title: An Act for the better Security of His Majesties Royal Person and Government.
- Citation: 7 & 8 Will. 3. c. 27
- Territorial extent: England and Wales

Dates
- Royal assent: 27 April 1696
- Commencement: 22 November 1695 (Note: Start of session.)
- Repealed: 15 July 1867
Other legislation
Amended by	Demise of the Crown Act 1702
Repealed by	Statute Law Revision Act 1867
Relates to	Correspondence with Enemies Act 1691; Treason Act 1695; Correspondence with Enemies Act 1704

Status: Repealed

Text of statute as originally enacted

The Security of King and Government Act 1695 (7 & 8 Will. 3. c. 27) was an act of the Parliament of England. Its long title was An act for the better security of his Majesty's royal person and government. It was passed in 1696 but backdated to the beginning of the parliamentary session.

Section 1 of the act required all officers to take the oath required by the Oaths of Allegiance and Supremacy Act 1688 (1 Will. & Mar. c. 8) or be disenfranchised. Section 1 of the act also provided that anyone who said that William III was not the lawful king, or that James Francis Edward Stuart (the "Old Pretender") or his late father James II and VII had any title to the Crown, or that anyone else had such title other than according to relevant acts of Parliament was guilty of praemunire. It was high treason to return to England from France without a licence after 1 May 1696.

== Subsequent developments ==
The whole act was repealed by section 1 of, and the schedule to, the Statute Law Revision Act 1867 (30 & 31 Vict. c. 59), which came into force on 15 July 1867.

== See also ==
- Jacobitism
- Correspondence with Enemies Act 1691
- Treason Act 1695
- Treason Act
