= Correspondence with James the Pretender (High Treason) Act 1701 =

Act of the Parliament of England

- Act of Parliament
- Parliament of England
- Long title: An Act for the Attainder of the pretended Prince of Wales of High Treason
- Citation: 13 & 14 Will. 3. c. 3 (Note: This is the citation in The Statutes of the Realm.); 13 Will. 3. c. 3 (Note: This is the citation in The Statutes at Large.)
- Territorial extent: England and Wales]

Dates
- Royal assent: 2 March 1701 [N.S.: 13 March 1702] (Note: During the lifetime of William III, two calendars were in use in Europe: the Old Style Julian calendar in Britain and parts of Northern and Eastern Europe, and the New Style Gregorian calendar elsewhere. In this article, dates up to 1752 follow the Julian calendar with New Year falling on 1 January. Dates thereafter, including the repeal date, are given according to the Gregorian calendar.)
- Commencement: 30 December 1701 (Note: Start of session.)
- Repealed: 30 July 1948
Other legislation
| Repealed by | Statute Law Revision Act 1948 |
| Relates to | Correspondence with Enemies Act 1691; Correspondence with the Pretender Act 1697; Security of the Succession, etc. Act 1701; Treason Act 1708; Treason Act 1743 |

Status: Repealed

Text of statute as originally enacted

The Correspondence with James the Pretender (High Treason) Act 1701 (13 & 14 Will. 3. c. 3) was an act of the Parliament of England passed in 1702. The act—the long title of which was "An Act for the Attainder of the pretended Prince of Wales of High Treason"— was a response to the Jacobite claim to the English and Scottish thrones of James Francis Edward Stuart (the Old Pretender), who declared himself King James III of England and Ireland and VIII of Scotland upon the death of his father, the exiled James II of England, in September 1701.

The act expressed the "utmost Resentment of so great an Indignity" and "manifest violation" to William III of England, declared that the "pretended Prince of Wales" was convicted and attainted of high treason and that he was "to suffer Pains of Death and incurr all Forfeitures as a Traitor"; and provided that if any English subject was to knowingly hold any correspondence with James Stuart, or with any person in his employ, or to knowingly spend or transmit any sum of money for the use of James, then on conviction they would be deemed guilty of high treason. If these offences were committed outside the realm, then they could be brought to trial in any English county.

== Subsequent developments ==
The whole act was repealed by section 1 of, and the first schedule to, the Statute Law Revision Act 1948 (11 & 12 Geo. 6. c. 62), which came into force on 30 July 1948.

== See also ==
- Correspondence with Enemies Act 1691
- Security of the Succession, etc. Act 1701
- Treason Act
- Treason Act 1743

== Bibliography ==
- W. C. Costin; J. Steven Watson, eds. (1952). The Law & Working of the Constitution: Documents 1660–1914. Vol. I (1660–1783). A&C Black. pp. 96–97.
