= Parliamentary Elections (Returns) Act 1695 =

Act of the Parliament of England

Parliamentary Elections (Returns) Act 1695 (Note: The citation of this act by this short title was authorised by section 5 of, and the second schedule to, the Statute Law Revision Act 1948. Due to the repeal of those provisions, it is now authorised by section 19(2) of the Interpretation Act 1978.)
- Act of Parliament
- Parliament of England
- Long title: An Act to prevent False and Double Returns of Members to Serve in Parliament. (Note: These words are printed against this act in the second column of the second schedule to the Statute Law Revision Act 1948, which is headed "Title".)
- Citation: 7 & 8 Will. 3. c. 7
- Territorial extent: England and Wales

Dates
- Royal assent: 13 February 1696
- Commencement: 22 November 1695 (Note: Start of session.)
- Repealed: 3 April 1950
Other legislation
Amended by	Returns to Parliament Act 1700; Parliament (No. 3) Act 1712; Statute Law Revision Act 1867; Statute Law Revision Act 1888; Representation of the People Act 1948
Repealed by	Representation of the People Act 1949
Relates to	Parliamentary Elections Act 1695

Status: Repealed

Text of statute as originally enacted

Returns to Parliament Act 1700
- Act of Parliament
- Parliament of England
- Long title: An Act for continuing a former Act to prevent false and Double Returns of Members to serve in Parliament.
- Citation: 12 & 13 Will. 3. c. 5
- Territorial extent: England and Wales

Dates
- Royal assent: 12 June 1701
- Commencement: 6 February 1701
- Repealed: 15 July 1867
Other legislation
Amends	Parliamentary Elections (Returns) Act 1695
Repealed by	Statute Law Revision Act 1867

Status: Repealed

Text of statute as originally enacted

Parliament (No. 3) Act 1712
- Act of Parliament
- Parliament of Great Britain
- Long title: An Act for making perpetual an Act, made in the Seventh Year of the Reign of the late King William, intituled, "An Act to prevent false and double Returns of Members to serve in Parliament."
- Citation: 12 Ann. c. 10 (Note: This is the citation in The Statutes of the Realm.); 12 Ann. St. 1. c. 10 (Note: This is the citation in The Statutes at Large.)
- Territorial extent: England and Wales

Dates
- Royal assent: 16 July 1713
- Commencement: 9 April 1713
- Repealed: 15 July 1867
Other legislation
Amends	Parliamentary Elections (Returns) Act 1695
Repealed by	Statute Law Revision Act 1867

Status: Repealed

Text of statute as originally enacted

The Parliamentary Elections (Returns) Act 1695 (7 & 8 Will. 3. c. 7) was an act of the Parliament of England.

== Subsequent developments ==
Section 7 of the act was repealed by section 1 of, and the schedule to, the Statute Law Revision Act 1867 (30 & 31 Vict. c. 59), which came into force on 15 July 1867.

The provisions as to procuring returns in sections 3 and 4 ceased to have effect by virtue of section 74(5) of, and schedule 11 to, the Representation of the People Act 1948 (11 & 12 Geo. 6. c. 65).

The whole act except section 5 was, and in section 5 the words "and for the more easy and better proof of any such false or double return" and the words from "and that the party" to the end of the section, was repealed by section 80(7) of, and the thirteenth schedule to, the Representation of the People Act 1948 (11 & 12 Geo. 6. c. 65), which came into force on 30 July 1948.

The whole act was repealed by section 175(1) of, and the ninth schedule to, the Representation of the People Act 1949 (12, 13 & 14 Geo. 6. c. 68), which came into force on 3 April 1950.

The whole act was repealed for the Republic of Ireland by section 3 of, and schedule 1 to, the Electoral Act 1963.
