= Alien Act 1705 =

Act of the Parliament of England

Union of England and Scotland Act 1704
- Act of Parliament
- Parliament of England
- Long title: An Act for the effectual securing the Kingdom of England from the apparent Dangers that may arise from several Acts lately passed in the Parliament of Scotland.
- Citation: 3 & 4 Ann. c. 6 (Note: This is the citation in The Statutes of the Realm.); 3 & 4 Ann. c. 7 (Note: This is the citation in The Statutes at Large.)
- Territorial extent: England and Wales

Dates
- Royal assent: 14 March 1705
- Commencement: 24 October 1704 (Note: Start of session.)
- Repealed: 15 July 1867

Other legislation
- Repealed by: Statute Law Revision Act 1867
- Relates to: Act of Settlement 1701; Maintenance of Church of England Act 1706

Status: Repealed

Text of statute as originally enacted

The Alien Act 1705 (3 & 4 Ann. c. 6) was an act of the Parliament of England in February 1705, as a response to the Parliament of Scotland's Act of Security 1704, which in turn was partially a response to the English Act of Settlement 1701 (12 & 13 Will. 3. c. 2). Lord Godolphin, the Lord High Treasurer, was instrumental in the Union of 1707 and all the acts leading up to it. The act was passed to prevent the inconveniences that would occur hastily if these two Kingdoms were not to become one Union.

The act provided that Scottish nationals in England were to be treated as aliens (foreign nationals), and estates held by Scots would be treated as alien property, making inheritance much less certain. It also included an embargo on the import of Scottish products into England and English colonies – about half of Scotland's trade, covering goods such as linen, cattle and coal. There was also an embargo on the export of arms, ammunition, and horses to Scotland so that they could not raise an army and invade England.

The act contained a provision that it would be suspended if the Scots entered into negotiations regarding a proposed union of the parliaments of Scotland and England. The act demanded that a settlement of succession or authorise union negotiation by 25 December 1705. The Scots insisted that the act be repealed before entering into treaty negotiations. In late December, news that both the Commons and the Lords had agreed to repeal the act reached the north. Combined with English financial offers to refund Scottish losses on the Darien scheme, the act achieved its aim, leading to the Acts of Union 1707 uniting the two countries as the Kingdom of Great Britain.

== Subsequent developments ==
The whole act was repealed by section 1 of, and the schedule to, the Statute Law Revision Act 1867 (30 & 31 Vict. c. 59), which came into force on 15 July 1867.
