= Continuance of Laws Act 1695 =

Act of the Parliament of England

- Act of Parliament
- Parliament of England
- Long title: An Act for continuing several Acts of Parliament, therein mentioned.
- Citation: 7 & 8 Will. 3. c. 36
- Territorial extent: England and Wales

Dates
- Royal assent: 27 April 1696
- Commencement: 22 November 1695 (Note: Start of session.)
- Repealed: 15 July 1867
Other legislation
Amends	Trade Act 1685; Exportation (Leather) Act 1688; Coal Trade, London Act 1664; Exportation Act 1667; Judgment Act 1692; Crown Office Procedure Act 1692
Repealed by	Statute Law Revision Act 1867
Relates to	See Expiring laws continuance acts

Status: Repealed

Text of statute as originally enacted

The Continuance of Laws Act 1695 (7 & 8 Will. 3. c. 36) was an act of the Parliament of England that continued and made perpetual various older acts.

== Background ==
In the United Kingdom, acts of Parliament remain in force until expressly repealed. Many acts of parliament, however, contained time-limited sunset clauses, requiring legislation to revive enactments that had expired or to continue enactments that would otherwise expire.

== Provisions ==
=== Continued enactments ===
Section 1 of the act continued the Exportation Act 1667 (19 & 20 Cha. 2. c. 10), as revived by the Trade Act 1685 (1 Ja. 2. c. 13) and revived and continued by the Exportation (Leather) Act 1688 (1 Will. & Mar. c. 23), until the end of the first session of the next parliament after 7 years from 1 March 1696.

Section 2 of the made the Coal Trade, London Act 1664 (16 & 17 Cha. 2. c. 2), as revived and continued by the Coals Act 1690 (2 Will. & Mar. Sess. 2. c. 7), perpetual.

Section 3 of the act made the Judgment Act 1692 (4 Will. & Mar. c. 20), as continued by the Continuance of Laws Act 1694 (6 & 7 Will. 3. c. 14), perpetual.

Section 4 of the act made the Crown Office Procedure Act 1692 (4 Will. & Mar. c. 22) perpetual.

== Subsequent developments ==
The Select Committee on Temporary Laws, Expired or Expiring, appointed in 1796, inspected and considered all temporary laws, observing irregularities in the construction of expiring laws continuance acts, making recommendations and emphasising the importance of the Committee for Expired and Expiring Laws.

The whole act was repealed by section 1 of, and the schedule to, the Statute Law Revision Act 1867 (30 & 31 Vict. c. 59), which came into force on 15 July 1867.
