= Quakers Act 1695 =

Act of the Parliament of England

- Act of Parliament
- Parliament of England
- Long title: An Act that the Solemne Affirmation & Declaration of the People called Quakers shall be accepted instead of an Oath in the usual Forme.
- Citation: 7 & 8 Will. 3. c. 34
- Territorial extent: England and Wales; Scotland

Dates
- Royal assent: 27 April 1696
- Commencement: 4 May 1696 (Note: Section 1.)
- Expired: 5 April 1702 (Note: Section 6.)
- Repealed: 1 January 1970
Other legislation
Amended by	Affirmation by Quakers Act 1701; Tithes and Church Rates Recovery Act 1714
Repealed by	Statute Law Revision Act 1867; Statute Law (Repeals) Act 1969

Status: Repealed

Text of statute as originally enacted

Affirmation by Quakers Act 1701
- Act of Parliament
- Parliament of England
- Long title: An Act for continuing an act, intituled, An Act that the Solemne Affirmation & Declaration of the People called Quakers shall be accepted instead of an Oath in the usual form.
- Citation: 13 & 14 Will. 3. c. 4 (Note: This is the citation in The Statutes of the Realm.)
- Territorial extent: England and Wales

Dates
- Royal assent: 2 March 1702
- Commencement: 30 December 1701 (Note: Start of session.)
- Expired: 8 August 1713 (Note: Section 1.)
- Repealed: 15 July 1867
Other legislation
Amends	Quakers Act 1695
Repealed by	Statute Law Revision Act 1867
Relates to	Tithes and Church Rates Recovery Act 1714

Status: Repealed

Text of statute as originally enacted

Tithes and Church Rates Recovery Act 1714
- Act of Parliament
- Parliament of Great Britain
- Long title: An Act for making perpetual an act of the seventh and eighth years of the reign of his late majesty King William the Third, intituled, An act that the solemn affirmation and declaration of the people called Quakers, shall be accepted instead of an oath in the usual form; and for explaining and enforcing the said act in relation to the payment of tithes and church rates; and for appointing the form of an affirmation to be taken by the said people called Quakers, instead of the oath of abjuration.
- Citation: 1 Geo. 1. St. 2. c. 6
- Territorial extent: Great Britain

Dates
- Royal assent: 20 July 1715
- Commencement: 17 March 1715 (Note: Start of session.)
- Repealed: 1 January 1970
Other legislation
Amends	Quakers Act 1695
Amended by	Statute Law Revision Act 1867
Repealed by	Promissory Oaths Act 1871Statute Law Revision Act 1887; Statute Law (Repeals) Act 1969

Status: Repealed

Text of statute as originally enacted

The Quakers Act 1695 (13 & 14 Will. 3. c. 4) was an act of the Parliament of England which allowed Quakers to substitute an affirmation where the law previously required an oath. The act did not apply to the oaths required when giving evidence in a criminal case or to serve on a jury or to hold any office of profit from the Crown. It allowed legal proceedings to be taken against Quakers before a justice of the peace for refusing to pay tithes if the amount claimed did not exceed £10.

The act would have expired in seven years but, in 1702, Parliament extended it for another eleven years by the Affirmation by Quakers Act 1701 13 & 14 Will. 3. c. 4. In 1715, it was made permanent and applied also to Scotland.

The act was made perpetual and extended to Scotland by the Tithes and Church Rates Recovery Act 1714 (1 Geo. 1. St. 2. c. 6).

== Subsequent developments ==
The whole act, except sections 3 and 4, was repealed by section 1 of, and the schedule to, the Statute Law Revision Act 1867 (30 & 31 Vict. c. 59), which came into force on 15 July 1867.

The whole act, so far as unrepealed, was repealed by section 1 of, and part II of the schedule to, the Statute Law (Repeals) Act 1969, which came into force on 1 January 1970.
