= List of acts of the Parliament of England from 1695 =

This is a list of acts of the Parliament of England for the year 1695.

For acts passed during the period 1707–1800, see the list of acts of the Parliament of Great Britain. See also the list of acts of the Parliament of Scotland, and the list of acts of the Parliament of Ireland.

For acts passed from 1801 onwards, see the list of acts of the Parliament of the United Kingdom. For acts of the devolved parliaments and assemblies in the United Kingdom, see the list of acts of the Scottish Parliament, the list of acts of the Northern Ireland Assembly, and the list of acts and measures of Senedd Cymru; see also the list of acts of the Parliament of Northern Ireland.

For medieval statutes, etc. that are not considered to be acts of Parliament, see the list of English statutes.

See also the List of ordinances and acts of the Parliament of England, 1642–1660 for ordinances and acts passed by the Long Parliament and other bodies without royal assent, and which were not considered to be valid legislation following the Restoration in 1660.

The number shown after each act's title is its chapter number. Acts are cited using this number, preceded by the years of the reign during which the relevant parliamentary session was held; thus the Union with Ireland Act 1800 is cited as "39 & 40 Geo. 3. c. 67", meaning the 67th act passed during the session that started in the 39th year of the reign of George III and which finished in the 40th year of that reign. The modern convention is to use Arabic numerals in citations (thus "41 Geo. 3" rather than "41 Geo. III"). Acts of the last session of the Parliament of Great Britain and the first session of the Parliament of the United Kingdom are both cited as "41 Geo. 3".

Acts passed by the Parliament of England did not have a short title; however, some of these acts have subsequently been given a short title by acts of the Parliament of the United Kingdom, such as the Short Titles Act 1896 (59 & 60 Vict. c. 14).

Acts passed by the Parliament of England were deemed to have come into effect on the first day of the session in which they were passed. Because of this, the years given in the list below may in fact be the year before a particular act was passed.

== 7 & 8 Will. 3 ==
The first session of the 3rd Parliament of William III, which met from 22 November 1695 until 27 April 1696.

This session was also traditionally cited as 7 & 8 Gul. 3, 7 & 8 W. 3, 7 Will. 3, 7 Gul. 3 or 7 W. 3.

=== Public acts ===
Short title	Citation	Royal assent
Long title
Coin Act 1695 (repealed)	7 & 8 Will. 3. c. 1	21 January 1696
An Act for remedying the Ill State of the Coin of the Kingdome. (Repealed by Statute Law Revision Act 1867 (30 & 31 Vict. c. 59))
Annuities, etc. Act 1695 (repealed)	7 & 8 Will. 3. c. 2	21 January 1696
An Act for enlargeing the Times to come in and purchase certain Annuities therein mentioned and for continuing the Duties formerly charged on Low Wines or Spirits of the first extraction for carrying on the Warr against France. (Note: The Nine Years' War.) (Repealed by Statute Law Revision Act 1867 (30 & 31 Vict. c. 59))
Treason Act 1695	7 & 8 Will. 3. c. 3	21 January 1696
An Act for regulateing of Tryals in Cases of Treason and Misprision of Treason.
Corrupt Practices Act 1695 or the Treating Act 1695 (repealed)	7 & 8 Will. 3. c. 4	21 January 1696
An Act for preventing Charge and Expence in Elections of Members to serve in Parliament. (Repealed by Corrupt Practices Prevention Act 1854 (17 & 18 Vict. c. 102))
Taxation Act 1695 (repealed)	7 & 8 Will. 3. c. 5	13 February 1696
An Act for granting to His Majesty an Aid of Four Shillings in the Pound for carrying on the War against France. (Repealed by Statute Law Revision Act 1867 (30 & 31 Vict. c. 59))
Recovery of Small Tithes Act 1695 (repealed)	7 & 8 Will. 3. c. 6	13 February 1696
An Act for the more easie Recoverie of Small Tythes. (Repealed by Statute Law Revision Act 1887 (50 & 51 Vict. c. 59))
Parliamentary Elections (Returns) Act 1695 (repealed)	7 & 8 Will. 3. c. 7	13 February 1696
An Act to prevent False and Double Returns of Members to serve in Parliament. (Repealed by Representation of the People Act 1949 (12, 13 & 14 Geo. 6. c. 68))
Public Accounts Act 1695 (repealed)	7 & 8 Will. 3. c. 8	24 February 1696
An Act for the taking examining and stating the Publick Accounts. (Repealed by Statute Law Revision Act 1867 (30 & 31 Vict. c. 59))
London to Harwich Roads Act 1695 (repealed)	7 & 8 Will. 3. c. 9	24 February 1696
An Act for repairing the Highways betweene the City of London and the Towne of Harwich in the County of Essex. (Repealed by Statute Law (Repeals) Act 2008 (c. 12))
Taxation (No. 2) Act 1695 (repealed)	7 & 8 Will. 3. c. 10	7 March 1696
An Act for continuing several Duties granted by former Acts upon Wine and Vinegar and upon Tobacco and East India Goods and other Merchandize imported for carrying on the Warr against France. (Repealed by Statute Law Revision Act 1867 (30 & 31 Vict. c. 59))
Habeas Corpus Suspension Act 1695 (repealed)	7 & 8 Will. 3. c. 11	7 March 1696
An Act for impowering His Majestie to apprehend and detain such persons as hee shall find Cause to suspect are conspiring against His Royal Person or Government. (Repealed by Statute Law Revision Act 1867 (30 & 31 Vict. c. 59))
Insolvent Debtors Relief Act 1695 (repealed)	7 & 8 Will. 3. c. 12	7 March 1696
An Act for Relief of Poor Prisoners for Debt or Damages. (Repealed by Statute Law Revision Act 1867 (30 & 31 Vict. c. 59))
Coining Act 1695 (repealed)	7 & 8 Will. 3. c. 13	7 March 1696
An Act for taking off the Obligation and Incouragement for coining Guineas for a certaine time therein mentioned. (Repealed by Statute Law Revision Act 1867 (30 & 31 Vict. c. 59))
Rivers Wye and Lugg Navigation Act 1695 (repealed)	7 & 8 Will. 3. c. 14	7 March 1696
An Act for making navigable the Rivers of Wye and Lugg in the County of Hereford. (Repealed by Gloucester Harbour Revision (Constitution) Order 2002 (SI 2002/3268))
Parliament Act 1695 (repealed)	7 & 8 Will. 3. c. 15	10 April 1696
An Act for the continueing meeting and sitting of a Parliament in case of the Death or Demise of His Majesty His Heirs and Successors. (Repealed by Statute Law Revision Act 1867 (30 & 31 Vict. c. 59))
Militia Act 1695 (repealed)	7 & 8 Will. 3. c. 16	10 April 1696
An Act for raiseing the Militia of this Kingdom for the Year One thousand six hundred ninety-six although the Months Pay formerly advanced bee not repaid. (Repealed by Statute Law Revision Act 1867 (30 & 31 Vict. c. 59))
Moss Troopers Act 1695 (repealed)	7 & 8 Will. 3. c. 17	10 April 1696
An Act to continue Foure former Acts (Note: Moss Troopers Act 1662 (14 Cha. 2. c. 22)) (Note: Moss Troopers Act 1666 (18 & 19 Cha. 2. c. 3)) (Note: Moss Troopers Act 1677 (29 & 30 Cha. 2. c. 2)) (Note: Moss Troopers Act 1685 (1 Ja. 2. c. 14)) for preventing Theft and Rapine upon the Northerne Borders of England. (Repealed by Statute Law Revision Act 1867 (30 & 31 Vict. c. 59))
Taxation (No. 3) Act 1695 (repealed)	7 & 8 Will. 3. c. 18	10 April 1696
An Act for granting to His Majesty severall Rates or Duties upon Houses for making good the Deficiency of the clipped Money. (Repealed by Statute Law Revision Act 1867 (30 & 31 Vict. c. 59))
Coinage Act 1695 (repealed)	7 & 8 Will. 3. c. 19	10 April 1696
An Act to incourage the bringing Plate into the Mint to be coined and for the further remedying the ill State of the Coine of the Kingdome. (Repealed by Statute Law Revision Act 1867 (30 & 31 Vict. c. 59))
Taxation (No. 4) Act 1695 (repealed)	7 & 8 Will. 3. c. 20	10 April 1696
An Act for granting to His Majesty an additionall Duty upon all French Goods and Merchandize. (Repealed by Statute Law Revision Act 1867 (30 & 31 Vict. c. 59))
Greenwich Hospital, etc. Act 1695 (repealed)	7 & 8 Will. 3. c. 21	10 April 1696
An Act for the Increase and Encouragement of Seamen. (Repealed by Greenwich Hospital Act 1834 (30 & 31 Vict. c. 59))
Plantation Trade Act 1695 or the Navigation Act 1696 (repealed)	7 & 8 Will. 3. c. 22	10 April 1696
An Act for preventing Frauds and regulating Abuses in the Plantation Trade. (Repealed by Statute Law Revision Act 1867 (30 & 31 Vict. c. 59))
Mutiny Act 1695 (repealed)	7 & 8 Will. 3. c. 23	10 April 1696
An Act for continueing severall former Acts for punishing Officers and Soldiers who shall Mutiny or Desert His Majesties Service and for punishing False Musters and for Payment of Quarters for One Yeare longer. (Repealed by Statute Law Revision Act 1867 (30 & 31 Vict. c. 59))
Oaths, etc. Act 1695 (repealed)	7 & 8 Will. 3. c. 24	10 April 1696
An Act requireing the Practicers of Law to take the Oaths and subscribe the Declaration therein mentioned. (Repealed by Statute Law Revision Act 1867 (30 & 31 Vict. c. 59))
Parliamentary Elections Act 1695	7 & 8 Will. 3. c. 25	10 April 1696
An Act for the further regulating Elections of Members to serve in Parliament and for the preventing irregular Proceedings of Sheriffs and other Officers in the electing and returning such Members.
Norfolk Roads Act 1695 (repealed)	7 & 8 Will. 3. c. 26	10 April 1696
An Act for repaireing the High-wayes betweene Wymondham and Attleborough in the County of Norfolk. (Repealed by Norfolk Roads Act 1766 (7 Geo. 3. c. 76))
Security of King and Government Act 1695 (repealed)	7 & 8 Will. 3. c. 27	27 April 1696
An Act for the better Security of His Majesties Royal Person and Government. (Repealed by Statute Law Revision Act 1867 (30 & 31 Vict. c. 59))
Wool Act 1695 (repealed)	7 & 8 Will. 3. c. 28	27 April 1696
An Act for the more effectual preventing the Exportacion of Wooll and for the incouraging the Importation thereof from Ireland. (Repealed by Statute Law Revision Act 1867 (30 & 31 Vict. c. 59))
Highways Act 1695 (repealed)	7 & 8 Will. 3. c. 29	27 April 1696
An Act for the better amending & repairing the High-ways and Explanacion of the Laws relateing thereunto. (Repealed by Highways (No. 2) Act 1766 (7 Geo. 3. c. 42))
Taxation, etc. Act 1695 (repealed)	7 & 8 Will. 3. c. 30	27 April 1696
An Act for laying several Duties upon Low Wines or Spirits of the first Extraction and for preventing the Frauds and Abuses of Brewers Distillers and other Persons chargeable with the Duties of Excise. (Repealed by Statute Law Revision Act 1867 (30 & 31 Vict. c. 59))
Taxation, etc. (No. 2) Act 1695 or the National Land Bank Act 1695 (repealed)	7 & 8 Will. 3. c. 31	27 April 1696
An Act for continuing to His Majesty certaine Duties upon Salt Glass Wares Stone and Earthen Wares and for granting several Duties upon Tobacco Pipes and other Earthen Wares for carrying on the Warr against France and for establishing a National Land Bank and for taking off the Duties upon Tunnage of Shipps and upon Coals. (Repealed by Statute Law Revision Act 1867 (30 & 31 Vict. c. 59))
Juries Act 1695 (repealed)	7 & 8 Will. 3. c. 32	27 April 1696
An Act for the Ease of Jurors and better regulating of Juries. (Repealed by Juries Act 1825 (6 Geo. 4. c. 50))
Greenland Trade Act 1695 (repealed)	7 & 8 Will. 3. c. 33	27 April 1696
An Act for the better Incouragement of the Greenland Trade. (Repealed by Statute Law Revision Act 1867 (30 & 31 Vict. c. 59))
Quakers Act 1695 (repealed)	7 & 8 Will. 3. c. 34	27 April 1696
An Act that the Solemne Affirmation & Declaration of the People called Quakers shall be accepted instead of an Oath in the usual Forme. (Repealed by Statute Law Revision Act 1867 (30 & 31 Vict. c. 59) and Statute Law (Repeals) Act 1969 (c. 52))
Marriage Duty Act 1695 (repealed)	7 & 8 Will. 3. c. 35	27 April 1696
An Act for the inforcing the Laws which restraine Marriages without Licence or Banns & for the better registring Marriags Births and Burials. (Repealed by Inland Revenue Repeal Act 1870 (33 & 34 Vict. c. 99))
Continuance of Laws Act 1695 (repealed)	7 & 8 Will. 3. c. 36	27 April 1696
An Act for continuing several Acts of Parliament, therein mentioned. (Repealed by Statute Law Revision Act 1867 (30 & 31 Vict. c. 59))
Mortmain Act 1695 (repealed)	7 & 8 Will. 3. c. 37	27 April 1696
An Act for the Encouragement of Charitable Gifts and Dispositions. (Repealed by Mortmain and Charitable Uses Act 1888 (51 & 52 Vict. c. 42))
Wills Act 1695 (repealed)	7 & 8 Will. 3. c. 38	27 April 1696
An Act to take away the Custome of Wales which hinders persons from disposeing their Personal Estates by their Wills. (Repealed by Statute Law Revision Act 1867 (30 & 31 Vict. c. 59))
Linen Manufacture Act 1695 (repealed)	7 & 8 Will. 3. c. 39	27 April 1696
An Act for encourageing the Linen Manufacture of Ireland and bringing Flax and Hemp into and the making of Sail Cloth in this Kingdome. (Repealed by Statute Law Revision Act 1867 (30 & 31 Vict. c. 59))
Duchy of Lancaster Act 1695	7 & 8 Will. 3. c. 40 (Note: This is the citation in The Statutes of the Realm.); 7 & 8 Will. 3. c. 41 Pr. (Note: This is the citation in The Statutes at Large.)	27 April 1696
An Act for revesting in His Majesty the Hono' of Tutbury Forrest of Needwood severall Manno's Parkes Lands and Offices and other Profitts thereunto belonging; and for vacatting certein Letters Patents therein mentioned.

=== Private acts ===
Short title	Citation	Royal assent
Long title
Lady Katherine Fane's Estate Act 1695	7 & 8 Will. 3. c. 1 Pr.	21 January 1696
An Act for enabling the Lady Katherine Fane to sell the Reversion of certain Fee-farm Rents, given to her by her Grandfather John Bence Esquire.
Sir Thomas Parkyns' Estate Act 1695	7 & 8 Will. 3. c. 2 Pr.	21 January 1696
An Act for enabling Sir Thomas Parkyns Baronet to sell certain Messuages, Lands, and Hereditaments, in Huby and Easingwould, in the County of Yorke; and for settling other Lands and Hereditaments, of greater Value, in Lieu thereof.
Enabling Sir Thomas Pope Blount to make a marriage settlement for his oldest son.	7 & 8 Will. 3. c. 3 Pr.	21 January 1696
An Act to enable Sir Thomas Pope Blount Baronet to make a Settlement, upon the Marriage of his Eldest Son.
Manor of Madeley Act 1695	7 & 8 Will. 3. c. 4 Pr.	21 January 1696
An Act for vesting the Manor of Madeley, in the County of Salop, in Trustees, for certain Purposes therein mentioned.
Enabling Thomas Stoner, a minor, to make a jointure and settlement of his estate in marriage.	7 & 8 Will. 3. c. 5 Pr.	21 January 1696
An Act for the enabling Thomas Stoner Esquire (Son and Heir of John Stoner Esquire, deceased) to make a Jointure and Settlement of his Estate in Marriage, notwithstanding his Minority.
Samuel Powell's Estate Act 1695	7 & 8 Will. 3. c. 6 Pr.	21 January 1696
An Act for vesting several Messuages and Lands belonging to Samuel Powell Esquire in Trustees, for Payment of his Debts.
Enabling Anthony Earl of Kent and Henry Grey his son to make a jointure for Henry's wife Jemima.	7 & 8 Will. 3. c. 7 Pr.	13 February 1696
An Act to enable Anthony Earl of Kent, and Henry Grey his Son and Heir Apparent, to make a Jointure for Jemima Wife of the said Henry Grey.
Lord Francis Powlett's Estate Act 1695	7 & 8 Will. 3. c. 8 Pr.	13 February 1696
An Act to enable the Lord Francis Powlet to charge his Estate with Provisions for his Younger Children.
Sir Nicholas and Sir Lawrence Stoughton's Estate Act 1695	7 & 8 Will. 3. c. 9 Pr.	13 February 1696
An Act for vesting the Estate late of Sir Nicholas Stoughton and Sir Lawrence Stoughton Baronets, deceased, in Trustees, to be sold, for the Payment of their Debts, and raising Portions for the Daughters of the said Sir Nicholas Stoughton.
Enabling Richard Haynes to settle a jointure on his wife and to exchange lands with Thomas Stevens' trustees.	7 & 8 Will. 3. c. 10 Pr.	13 February 1696
An Act to enable Richard Haynes Esquire to settle a Jointure on his now Wife, and to exchange Lands with the Trustees of Thomas Stevens Esquire deceased.
Edmond Warner's Estate Act 1695	7 & 8 Will. 3. c. 11 Pr.	13 February 1696
An Act for enabling Trustees to sell Part of the Estate of Edmond Warner deceased, for Payment of his Debts, and for preserving the rest for the Benefit of his Heir.
Enabling John Aunger, an infant, and his mother to lease his estate.	7 & 8 Will. 3. c. 12 Pr.	13 February 1696
An Act to enable John Aunger an Infant, and his Mother, to make a Lease of his Estate, for the Improvement thereof.
Manor of Barkhampstead Act 1695	7 & 8 Will. 3. c. 13 Pr.	13 February 1696
An Act to enable Trustees to sell Part of the Manor of Barkhamstead, and to pay off the Incumbrances charged on the same; and to lay out the Overplus in an Estate, to be settled as the said Manor is now vested.
Naturalization of the children of Henry de Nassau Seignior de Auverquerke.	7 & 8 Will. 3. c. 14 Pr.	24 February 1696
An Act for naturalizing Henry de Nassau, and other Children of Henry de Nassau Seign'r d' Averquerke.
John Fownes' Estate Act 1695	7 & 8 Will. 3. c. 15 Pr.	24 February 1696
An Act to enable John Fownes Esquire to sell certain Lands, in the County of Devon, which were settled on his Marriage; and to settle other Lands, of an equal Value, to the same Uses.
Sir James Chamberlaine's Estate Act 1695	7 & 8 Will. 3. c. 16 Pr.	7 March 1696
An Act to enable Trustees to exchange Lands of Sir James Chamberlain Baronet, an Infant, lying in the Common Hill or Field of Salford, in the County of Oxford, for like Quantities of Lands there, in order to the making an Enclosure.
St. James's Parish, Westminster Act 1695	7 & 8 Will. 3. c. 17 Pr.	7 March 1696
An Act to enable the Parish of St. James, within the Liberties of the City of Westminster, to raise (upon themselves) so much Money as will discharge their Debt, for building their Parish Church, Rector's House, Vestry, and other public Works there.
St. Lawrence Old Jewry Act 1695 (repealed)	7 & 8 Will. 3. c. 18 Pr.	7 March 1696
An Act to Ascertain and Settle the payment of the Impropriate Tythes of the parish of Saint Lawrance Old Jury in London to the Master and Schollars of Ballioll Colledge in Oxford and for Confirmeing an Award made concerning the Same. (Repealed by City of London (Various Powers) Act 1950 (14 Geo. 6. c. v))
Naturalization of James Stanhope and others.	7 & 8 Will. 3. c. 19 Pr.	7 March 1696
An Act for naturalizing James Stanhope Esquire, and others.
Naturalization of Salomon Eyme and others.	7 & 8 Will. 3. c. 20 Pr.	7 March 1696
An Act for naturalizing Salomon Eyme and others.
Thomas Rider's and Christopher Clitherow's Estates Act 1695	7 & 8 Will. 3. c. 21 Pr.	7 March 1696
An Act to confirm and establish an Exchange made between Thomas Ryder Esquire and Christopher Clitherow Esquire, of certain Messuages in London, for the Manor of Bilsington, and other Lands in Kent, of the like Value.
Bluet and John Wallop's Estates Act 1695	7 & 8 Will. 3. c. 22 Pr.	7 March 1696
An Act to enable Trustees to make and fill up Leases of the respective Estates of Bluet Wallop Esquire and John Wallop Gentleman, during their Minorities; and to purchase other Lands by the Fines thereby to be received, to the same Uses as the Estates so to be leased are already settled.
William Midford's Estate Act 1695	7 & 8 Will. 3. c. 23 Pr.	7 March 1696
An Act for enabling Trustees to sell the Manor of Pespoole, in the County of Durham, Part of the Estate of William Midford, an Infant, for Payment of Debts and Incumbrances charged thereon, and for preserving the rest of the said Infant's Estate.
Empowering Anne, Duchess of Buccleuch and her son James, Earl of Dalkeith to grant leases for improving ground in St. Martins-in-the-Fields (Middlesex).	7 & 8 Will. 3. c. 24 Pr.	10 April 1696
An Act for empowering the most Noble Anne Dutchess of Buccleuch, and the Right Honourable James Earl of Dalkeith her Son, of the Kingdom of Scotland, to grant Leases, for improving a Piece of Ground, in the Parish of St. Martin's in the Fields, in the County of Middl'x.
Howland Great Wet Dock Act 1695	7 & 8 Will. 3. c. 25 Pr.	10 April 1696
An Act to enable Trustees to raise Money, for the making a Wet Dock, and improving the Estate of the Marquis and Marchioness of Tavistock, at Rodherhith, in the County of Surrey.
Naturalization of William Viscount Tunbridge and other children of Earl of Rochford.	7 & 8 Will. 3. c. 26 Pr.	10 April 1696
An Act to naturalize William commonly called Viscount Tunbridge, and other Children of the Earl of Rochford.
Improvement of a house and ground in Great Queen Street.	7 & 8 Will. 3. c. 27 Pr.	10 April 1696
An Act for the better Improvement of a House and Ground in Great Queen Street.
Sir Robert Sawyer's Estate Act 1695: sale of a messuage in Lincoln's Inn Fields and purchase of other lands and tenements to be settled to the same uses.	7 & 8 Will. 3. c. 28 Pr.	10 April 1696
An Act to enable Trustees to sell a Messuage, Garden, and Out-house, in Lincolne's Inn Fields, late of Sir Robert Sawyer Knight, deceased; and for purchasing other Lands and Tenements, to be settled to the same Uses.
Settlement of lands and rentcharges on the rector of Maidwell church (Northamptonshire) and his successors, and in lieu settling other lands and discharging tithes belonging to the said church according to agreements between the patron and the rector made upon inclosure of lands in Maidwell, and later with the consent of the Ordinary confirmed by a Court of Chancery decree.	7 & 8 Will. 3. c. 29 Pr.	10 April 1696
An Act for settling divers Lands and Rentcharge on the Rector of the Church of Maydwell, in the County of Northampton, and his Successors; and, in Lieu thereof, for settling other Lands, and discharging Tithes belonging to the said Church, according to several Agreements between the Patron and the said Rector, made upon the enclosing of Lands in Maydwell, and afterwards, with Consent of the Ordinary, confirmed by several Decrees in the Court of Chancery.
Richard Jones' and Mary Gufford's (minors) personal estate: settling in trustees.	7 & 8 Will. 3. c. 30 Pr.	10 April 1696
An Act for settling the Personal Estate of Richard Jones Esquire and Mary Gyfford Spinster, Minors, in Trustees, for the Purposes therein mentioned.
Bristol Water Supply Act 1695	7 & 8 Will. 3. c. 31 Pr.	10 April 1696
An Act for the better supplying the City of Bristol with fresh Water.
Bristol Workhouse Act 1695 or the Bristol Poor Act 1695	7 & 8 Will. 3. c. 32 Pr.	10 April 1696
An Act for erecting of Hospitals and Workhouses within the City of Bristoll, for the better employing and maintaining the Poor thereof.
Sir William Barkham's Estate Act 1695	7 & 8 Will. 3. c. 33 Pr.	10 April 1696
An Act for making good the last Will of Sir William Barkham Baronet, deceased; and vesting of Lands in Trustees, to be sold, for Payment of his Debts, and making Provision for his Children.
Enabling Sir Charles Heron to sell lands for payment of a portion and debts.	7 & 8 Will. 3. c. 34 Pr.	10 April 1696
An Act to enable Sir Charles Heron Baronet to sell Lands, for Payment of a Portion and Debts.
Enabling Sir Thomas Wagstaffe to raise a portion for Frances his only daughter.	7 & 8 Will. 3. c. 35 Pr.	10 April 1696
An Act to enable Sir Thomas Wagstaffe Knight to raise and secure a Portion for Frances his only Daughter and Heir Apparent.
Sale of the moiety of manor of Shepton Mallet (Somerset) and a divided moiety of manor of Wells (Somerset) for payment of a mortgage and maintenance of Mary, wife of William Sandes, and her children.	7 & 8 Will. 3. c. 36 Pr.	10 April 1696
An Act for vesting a Molety of the Manor of Shepton Mallet, in the County of Somerset, and a divided Moiety of the Manor of Wells, in the said County, in Trustees, to be sold, for Payment of a Mortgage charged thereon; and for making a Provision for the Maintenance of Mary the Wife of William Sands Esquire, and her Children.
Making towns of Stretton and Princethorpe a separate parish from Wolston (Warwickshire).	7 & 8 Will. 3. c. 37 Pr.	10 April 1696
An Act for making the Towns of Stretton and Princethorpe a separate Parish from Woolston, in the County of Warwick.
Joseph Dawson's Estate Act 1695	7 & 8 Will. 3. c. 38 Pr.	10 April 1696
An Act for vesting Part of the Estate of Joseph Dawson Esquire in Trustees, for Payment of Debts, and for a Provision for the Maintenance and Marriage of his Daughters.
William Ridout's Estate Act 1695	7 & 8 Will. 3. c. 39 Pr.	10 April 1696
An Act for Sale of Lands in Horsington, in the County of Somerset, Part of the Estate of William Ridout an Infant, for Payment of Incumbrances charged thereon; and for preserving the Residue of the said Estate for the Infant.
Thomas Bigg's and Wife's Estate Act 1695	7 & 8 Will. 3. c. 40 Pr.	10 April 1696
An Act for vesting certain Lands of Thomas Bigg and his Wife, in Chislet, in the County of Kent, in Trustees, for Payment of Debts, and making Provision for their Children.
Duchy of Lancaster Act 1695	7 & 8 Will. 3. c. 41 Pr. (Note: Also listed as 7 & 8 Will. 3. c. 40.)	27 April 1696
An Act for re-vesting in His Majesty the Honour of Tutbury, Forest of Needwood, several Manors, Parks, Lands, and Offices, and other Profits thereunto belonging, and for vacating certain Letters Patents therein mentioned.

=== Sources ===
- Raithby, John, ed. (1963) [1820]. "7° & 8° Gul. III.". Statutes of the Realm. Vol. 7: The Statutes of King William III (1695–1701). London: Dawsons. pp. 1–160 – via HathiTrust.
- Raithby, John, ed. (1820). Statutes of the Realm. Vol. 7: 1696-1701 – via British History Online.
- Pickering, Danby, ed. (1764). "Anno septimo Gulielmi & Mariæ". The Statutes at Large. Vol. 9: From the First Year of K. William and Q. Mary to Eighth Year of K. William III – 1688 to 1695–96. Cambridge: Joseph Bentham. pp. 380–393 – via Internet Archive.
- Pickering, Danby, ed. (1764). "Anno septimo Gulielmi & Mariæ". The Statutes at Large. Vol. 9: From the First Year of K. William and Q. Mary to Eighth Year of K. William III – 1688 to 1695–96. Cambridge: Joseph Bentham. pp. 380–393 – via Internet Archive.
- Pickering, Danby, ed. (1764). "Anno septimo & octavo Gulielmi & Mariæ". The Statutes at Large. Vol. 9: From the First Year of K. William and Q. Mary to Eighth Year of K. William III – 1688 to 1695–96. Cambridge: Joseph Bentham. pp. 393–506 – via Internet Archive.
- Pickering, Danby, ed. (1764). "Anno septimo & octavo Gulielmi & Mariæ". The Statutes at Large. Vol. 9: From the First Year of K. William and Q. Mary to Eighth Year of K. William III – 1688 to 1695–96. Cambridge: Joseph Bentham. pp. 393–506 – via Internet Archive.
- Chronological Table of and Index to the Statutes. Vol. 1: To the End of the Session 59 Vict. Sess. 2 (1895) (13th ed.). London: Her Majesty's Stationery Office. 1896. pp. 77–78 – via Google Books.
- "Acts of the English Parliament from 1695". legislation.gov.uk. The National Archives.
- "Chronological Tables of the Private and Personal Acts: Part 5 (1695–1701)". legislation.gov.uk. The National Archives.

== See also ==
- List of acts of the Parliament of England
