= List of acts of the Parliament of England from 1580 =

This is a list of acts of the Parliament of England for the year 1580.

For acts passed during the period 1707–1800, see the list of acts of the Parliament of Great Britain. See also the list of acts of the Parliament of Scotland, and the list of acts of the Parliament of Ireland.

For acts passed from 1801 onwards, see the list of acts of the Parliament of the United Kingdom. For acts of the devolved parliaments and assemblies in the United Kingdom, see the list of acts of the Scottish Parliament, the list of acts of the Northern Ireland Assembly, and the list of acts and measures of Senedd Cymru; see also the list of acts of the Parliament of Northern Ireland.

For medieval statutes, etc. that are not considered to be acts of Parliament, see the list of English statutes.

See also the List of ordinances and acts of the Parliament of England, 1642–1660 for ordinances and acts passed by the Long Parliament and other bodies without royal assent, and which were not considered to be valid legislation following the Restoration in 1660.

The number shown after each act's title is its chapter number. Acts are cited using this number, preceded by the years of the reign during which the relevant parliamentary session was held; thus the Union with Ireland Act 1800 is cited as "39 & 40 Geo. 3. c. 67", meaning the 67th act passed during the session that started in the 39th year of the reign of George III and which finished in the 40th year of that reign. The modern convention is to use Arabic numerals in citations (thus "41 Geo. 3" rather than "41 Geo. III"). Acts of the last session of the Parliament of Great Britain and the first session of the Parliament of the United Kingdom are both cited as "41 Geo. 3".

Acts passed by the Parliament of England did not have a short title; however, some of these acts have subsequently been given a short title by acts of the Parliament of the United Kingdom, such as the Short Titles Act 1896 (59 & 60 Vict. c. 14).

Acts passed by the Parliament of England were deemed to have come into effect on the first day of the session in which they were passed. Because of this, the years given in the list below may in fact be the year before a particular act was passed.

== 23 Eliz. 1 ==
The third session of the 4th Parliament of Queen Elizabeth I, which met from 16 January 1581 until 18 March 1581.

This session was traditionally cited as 23 Eliz., 23 Elz. or 23 El.

=== Public acts ===
Short title	Citation	Royal assent
Long title
Religion Act 1580 (repealed)	23 Eliz. 1. c. 1	18 March 1581
An Act to retain the Queen's Majesty's Subjects in their due Obedience. (Repealed for England and Wales by Roman Catholics Act 1844 (7 & 8 Vict. c. 102) and for the Isle of Man by Statute Law Revision (Isle of Man) Act 1991 (c. 61))
Seditious Words Act 1580 or the Seditious Words and Rumours Act 1580 (repealed)	23 Eliz. 1. c. 2	18 March 1581
An act against seditious words and rumours uttered against the Queen's most excellent majesty. (Repealed by Statute Law Revision Act 1863 (26 & 27 Vict. c. 125))
Fines and Recoveries Act 1580 (repealed)	23 Eliz. 1. c. 3	18 March 1581
An act for the reformation of errors in fines and recoveries. (Repealed by Statute Law Revision and Civil Procedure Act 1881 (44 & 45 Vict. c. 59))
Border Defences Act 1580 (repealed)	23 Eliz. 1. c. 4	18 March 1581
An act for fortifying of the borders towards Scotland. (Repealed by Statute Law Revision Act 1863 (26 & 27 Vict. c. 125))
Preservation of Wood Act 1580 (repealed)	23 Eliz. 1. c. 5	18 March 1581
An act touching iron mills near unto the city of London, and the river of Thames. (Repealed by Repeal of Obsolete Statutes Act 1856 (19 & 20 Vict. c. 64))
Dover Harbour Act 1580 (repealed)	23 Eliz. 1. c. 6	18 March 1581
An act for the repairing of Dover haven. (Repealed by Statute Law Revision Act 1948 (11 & 12 Geo. 6. c. 62))
Navigation Act 1580 (repealed)	23 Eliz. 1. c. 7	18 March 1581
An act for the increase of mariners, and for maintenance of the navigation. (Repealed by Repeal of Acts Concerning Importation Act 1822 (3 Geo. 4. c. 41))
Wax Act 1580 (repealed)	23 Eliz. 1. c. 8	18 March 1581
An Act touching the true melting, making and working of Wax. (Repealed by Repeal of Obsolete Statutes Act 1856 (19 & 20 Vict. c. 64))
Dyeing of Cloth Act 1580 (repealed)	23 Eliz. 1. c. 9	18 March 1581
An act for the abolishing of certain deceitful stuff used in the dying of cloth. (Repealed by Woollen Manufacture Act 1809 (49 Geo. 3. c. 109))
Game Act 1580 (repealed)	23 Eliz. 1. c. 10	18 March 1581
An act for preservation of pheasants and partridges. (Repealed by Game Act 1831 (1 & 2 Will. 4. c. 32))
Cardiff Bridge Act 1580 (repealed)	23 Eliz. 1. c. 11	18 March 1581
An act for the re-edifying of Cardiff-bridge, in the county of Glamorgan. (Repealed by Bridges Act 1702 (1 Ann. c. 12))
Paving Streets in London Act 1580 (repealed)	23 Eliz. 1. c. 12	18 March 1581
An act for an addition to a former act made anno 13 of her Majesty's reign, (Note: London Streets Act 1571 (13 Eliz. 1. c. 23)) for the paving of a street without Aldgate, leading to her Highness storehouses at the Minories, and other places. (Repealed by Statute Law Revision Act 1948 (11 & 12 Geo. 6. c. 62))
Land Reclamation (Plumstead Marsh) Act 1580 (repealed)	23 Eliz. 1. c. 13	18 March 1581
An act for the inning of Earith and Plumpstead marsh. (Repealed by Statute Law Revision Act 1948 (11 & 12 Geo. 6. c. 62))
Taxation Act 1580 (repealed)	23 Eliz. 1. c. 14	18 March 1581
An act for a subsidy granted by the clergy. (Repealed by Statute Law Revision Act 1863 (26 & 27 Vict. c. 125))
Taxation (No. 2) Act 1580 (repealed)	23 Eliz. 1. c. 15	18 March 1581
An act for a subsidy and two fifteens granted by the temporalty. (Repealed by Statute Law Revision Act 1863 (26 & 27 Vict. c. 125))
Act of General Pardon 1580 (repealed)	23 Eliz. 1. c. 16	18 March 1581
An act for the Queen's majesty's most gracious, general, and free pardon. (Repealed by Statute Law Revision Act 1863 (26 & 27 Vict. c. 125))
Exeter Gavelkind Lands Act 1580 (repealed)	23 Eliz. 1. c. 17 (Ruffhead c. 12)	18 March 1581
An Acte that Gavelkind Landes within the Cyttye of Exceter maye be enheritable as Landes at the Cōmon Lawe. (Repealed by Statute Law Revision Act 1948 (11 & 12 Geo. 6. c. 62))

=== Private acts ===
Short title	Citation	Royal assent
Long title
Cringleford Rebuilding Act 1580	23 Eliz. 1. c. 1 Pr. (Note: This is the citation in The Statutes of the Realm.); 23 Eliz. 1. c. 2 Pr. (Note: This is the citation in The Statutes at Large.)	18 March 1581
An act for the re-edifying of the town of Cringleford near the city of Norwich.
Naturalization of Coppinger, Boureman, Watson, Holmes, Harman, Hughes and others.	23 Eliz. 1. c. 2 Pr. 23 Eliz. 1. c. 3 Pr.	18 March 1581
An act for the denization of Walter Coppinger and Suzan Coppinger, Hugh and Simon Boureman, William Watson, and James, Rickard, Francis, Mary, Margarett, Abigall, and Gertrude Holmes, Thomas, Harman, Giles, John, Richard, and Katherine Hughes, and divers others.
Coventry Grammar School Estate Act 1580	23 Eliz. 1. c. 3 Pr. 23 Eliz. 1. c. 4 Pr.	18 March 1581
An act for the perfecting of assurances of certain lands given for the maintenance of a free grammar school within the city of Coventry.
Sir Thomas Gresham's Estate Act 1580	23 Eliz. 1. c. 4 Pr. 23 Eliz. 1. c. 5 Pr.	18 March 1581
An act for the establishment of an agreement between Sir Henry Nevill, Knight, and dame Anne Gresham, widow, for the better performing the last will of Sir Thomas Gresham, knight, deceased, and for the payment of his debts.
Bishop of Coventry and Lichfield's Estate Act 1580	23 Eliz. 1. c. 5 Pr. 23 Eliz. 1. c. 6 Pr.	18 March 1581
An act for assurance of certain lands to Edward Fysher; and for assurance of a rent-charge of four score and two pounds ten shillings, and other things, to the bishop of Coventry and Litchfield.
Earl of Arundel's Restitution Act 1580	23 Eliz. 1. c. 6 Pr. 23 Eliz. 1. c. 7 Pr.	18 March 1581
An act for the restitution in blood of Philip earl of Arundell.
John and Dudley St. Leger's Restitution Act 1580	23 Eliz. 1. c. 7 Pr. 23 Eliz. 1. c. 8 Pr.	18 March 1581
An act of pardon and restitution in blood of John Seyntleger and Dudley Seyntleger.
Anthony Mayney's Restitution Act 1580	23 Eliz. 1. c. 8 Pr. 23 Eliz. 1. c. 9 Pr.	18 March 1581
An act for the restitution in blood of Anthony Mayne, esquire.
Lord Compton's Estate Act 1580	23 Eliz. 1. c. 9 Pr. 23 Eliz. 1. c. 10 Pr.	18 March 1581
An act for the better assurance of divers lands in Chipping Norton, and elsewhere in the county of Oxford, being parcel of the inheritance of the lord Marney, to Henry lord Compton.
Ratification of Chancery award concerning copyholders and customary tenants of the manors of Moore, Newham, Lyndriche, Knighton and Pensokes (Worcestershire).	23 Eliz. 1. c. 10 Pr. 23 Eliz. 1. c. 11 Pr.	18 March 1581
An act ratifying a decree and an award in the chancery, touching certain copyholders and customary tenants of the manors of More Newnam, Lyndriche, Knighton and Penfocks, in the county of Worcester.
Ratification of award between William Hide and William Darrell.	23 Eliz. 1. c. 11 Pr. 23 Eliz. 1. c. 13 Pr.	18 March 1581
An act for ratification of an award made between William Hide of the one part, and William Darrell of the other part.
Ledbury Hospital Act 1580	23 Eliz. 1. c. 12 Pr. 23 Eliz. 1. c. 14 Pr.	18 March 1581
An act concerning the hospital of Ledburye (Note: St Katherine's Hospital, Ledbury.) in the county of Hereford.
Lord Latymer's Estate Act 1580	23 Eliz. 1. c. 13 Pr. 23 Eliz. 1. c. 1 Pr.	18 March 1581
An act for the partition of certain lands between the coheirs of the lord Latymer.

=== Sources ===
- "23° Eliz.". The Statutes of the Realm. Vol. 4 Part 1: 1547 to 1584. pp. 656–702 – via HathiTrust.
- Pickering, Danby, ed. (1763). "Anno vicesimo tertio Elizabethæ". The Statutes at Large. Vol. 6: from the First Year of Queen Mary to the Thirty-fifth Year of Queen Elizabeth, inclusive. Cambridge: Joseph Bentham. pp. 332–348 – via Internet Archive.
- Pickering, Danby, ed. (1763). "Anno vicesimo tertio Elizabethæ". The Statutes at Large. Vol. 6: from the First Year of Queen Mary to the Thirty-fifth Year of Queen Elizabeth, inclusive. Cambridge: Joseph Bentham. pp. 332–348 – via Internet Archive.
- Journal of the House of Commons. Vol. 1 – 1547-1629. His Majesty's Stationery Office. 1802 – via British History Online.
- Journal of the House of Lords. Vol. 2: 1578-1614. London: His Majesty's Stationery Office. 1830 – via British History Online.
- Chronological Table of and Index to the Statutes. Vol. 1: To the End of the Session 59 Vict. Sess. 2 (1895) (13th ed.). London: Her Majesty's Stationery Office. 1896. p. 62 – via Google Books.
- Chronological Table of the Statutes: Covering the Period from 1235 to the End of 1971. London: Her Majesty's Stationery Office. 1972. pp. 59–60. ISBN 978-0-11-840096-1 – via Google Books.
- "Chronological Tables of the Private and Personal Acts: Part 1 (1539–1601)". legislation.gov.uk. The National Archives.

== See also ==
- List of acts of the Parliament of England
