= Bridges Act =

Legislation in the UK

Bridges Act is a stock short title used in the United Kingdom for legislation relating to bridges.

== List ==
Acts of the Parliament of England

- The Bridges Act 1530 (22 Hen. 8. c. 5)
- The Bridges Act 1670 (22 Cha. 2. c. 12)
- The Bridges Act 1702 (1 Ann. c. 12)

The Bridges Acts

The Bridges Acts 1740 to 1815 was the collective title of the following acts:

- The Bridges Act 1740 (14 Geo. 2. c. 38)
- The Bridges Act 1803 (43 Geo. 3. c. 59)
- The Bridges Act 1812 (52 Geo. 3. c. 110)
- The Bridges Act 1814 (54 Geo. 3. c. 90)
- The Bridges Act 1815 (55 Geo. 3. c. 143)

The Bridges (Ireland) Acts 1813 to 1875 was the collective title of the following acts:

- The Bridges (Ireland) Act 1813 (53 Geo. 3. c. 77)
- The Bridges (Ireland) Act 1834 (4 & 5 Will. 4. c. 61)
- The Bridges (Ireland) Act 1843 (6 & 7 Vict. c. 42)
- The Bridges (Ireland) Act 1850 (13 & 14 Vict. c. 4)
- The Bridges (Ireland) Act 1851 (14 & 15 Vict. c. 21)
- The Bridges (Ireland) Act 1867 (30 & 31 Vict. c. 50)
- The Bridges (Ireland) Act 1875 (38 & 39 Vict. c. 46)

== See also ==
- List of short titles
