= List of acts of the Parliament of England from 1702 =

This is a list of acts of the Parliament of England for the year 1702.

For acts passed during the period 1707–1800, see the list of acts of the Parliament of Great Britain. See also the list of acts of the Parliament of Scotland, and the list of acts of the Parliament of Ireland.

For acts passed from 1801 onwards, see the list of acts of the Parliament of the United Kingdom. For acts of the devolved parliaments and assemblies in the United Kingdom, see the list of acts of the Scottish Parliament, the list of acts of the Northern Ireland Assembly, and the list of acts and measures of Senedd Cymru; see also the list of acts of the Parliament of Northern Ireland.

For medieval statutes, etc. that are not considered to be acts of Parliament, see the list of English statutes.

See also the List of ordinances and acts of the Parliament of England, 1642–1660 for ordinances and acts passed by the Long Parliament and other bodies without royal assent, and which were not considered to be valid legislation following the Restoration in 1660.

The number shown after each act's title is its chapter number. Acts are cited using this number, preceded by the years of the reign during which the relevant parliamentary session was held; thus the Union with Ireland Act 1800 is cited as "39 & 40 Geo. 3. c. 67", meaning the 67th act passed during the session that started in the 39th year of the reign of George III and which finished in the 40th year of that reign. The modern convention is to use Arabic numerals in citations (thus "41 Geo. 3" rather than "41 Geo. III"). Acts of the last session of the Parliament of Great Britain and the first session of the Parliament of the United Kingdom are both cited as "41 Geo. 3".

Acts passed by the Parliament of England did not have a short title; however, some of these acts have subsequently been given a short title by acts of the Parliament of the United Kingdom, such as the Short Titles Act 1896 (59 & 60 Vict. c. 14).

Acts passed by the Parliament of England were deemed to have come into effect on the first day of the session in which they were passed. Because of this, the years given in the list below may in fact be the year before a particular act was passed.

== 1 Ann. ==
The 6th Parliament of William III. From the accession of Queen Anne on 8 March 1702 until 25 May 1702.

This session was also traditionally cited as 1 Anne, 1 A., 1 Ann. St. 1 (in Ruffhead's The Statutes at Large) or 1 A. St. 1.

=== Public acts ===
| Short title | Citation | Royal assent |
Long title
| Crown Lands Act 1702 | 1 Ann. c. 1 (Note: This is the citation in The Statutes of the Realm.); 1 Ann. St. 1. c. 7 (Note: This is the citation in The Statutes at Large.) (Note: The numbering for 1 Ann. St. 1 in The Statutes at Large continues from 13 Will., and hence starts at c. 7.) | 30 March 1702 |
An Act for the better Support of Her Majesties Houshold and of the Honour and Dignity of the Crown.
| Demise of the Crown Act 1702 | 1 Ann. c. 2; 1 Ann. St. 1. c. 8 | 30 March 1702 |
An Act for explaining a Clause in an Act made at the Parliament begun and holden at Westminster the two and twentieth of November in the Seventh year of the Reign of our Sovereign Lord King William the Third intituled "An Act for the better Security of His Majesties Royal Person and Government." (Note: Security of King and Government Act 1695 (7 & 8 Will. 3. c. 27))
| Assay of Plate Act 1702 (repealed) | 1 Ann. c. 3; 1 Ann. St. 1. c. 9 | 30 March 1702 |
An Act for continuing an Act made in the Eighth Year of his late Majesty's reign, (Note: Coin Act 1696 (8 & 9 Will. 3. c. 26)) for better preventing the counterfeiting the current coin of this kingdom. (Repealed by Hallmarking Act 1973 (c. 43))
| Public Accounts Act 1702 (repealed) | 1 Ann. c. 4; 1 Ann. St. 1. c. 10 | 30 March 1702 |
An Act for taking, examining, and stating the Publick Accounts of the kingdom. (Repealed by Statute Law Revision Act 1867 (30 & 31 Vict. c. 59))
| Apothecaries Act 1702 (repealed) | 1 Ann. c. 5; 1 Ann. St. 1. c. 11 | 30 March 1702 |
An Act for reviving the Act, intituled, "An Act for exempting Apothecaries from serving the Offices of Constable, Scavenger, and other Public and Wardoffices, and from serving upon Juries." (Note: Exemptions of Apothecaries Act 1694 (6 & 7 Will. & Mar. c. 4)) (Repealed by Statute Law Revision Act 1867 (30 & 31 Vict. c. 59))
| Land Tax, Forfeited Estates, etc. Act 1702 (repealed) | 1 Ann. c. 6; 1 Ann. St. 1. c. 12 | 6 May 1702 |
An Act for granting an aid to her Majesty by divers subsidies and a land tax. (Repealed by Statute Law Revision Act 1867 (30 & 31 Vict. c. 59))
| Taxation, etc. Act 1702 (repealed) | 1 Ann. c. 7; 1 Ann. St. 1. c. 13 | 6 May 1702 |
An Act for making good deficiencies, and for preserving the publick credit. (Repealed by Statute Law Revision Act 1867 (30 & 31 Vict. c. 59))
| Union between England and Scotland Act 1702 (repealed) | 1 Ann. c. 8; 1 Ann. St. 1. c. 14 | 6 May 1702 |
An Act for enabling her Majesty to appoint commissioners to treat for an union between the kingdoms of England and Scotland. (Repealed by Statute Law Revision Act 1867 (30 & 31 Vict. c. 59))
| Water Measure of Fruit Act 1702 (repealed) | 1 Ann. c. 9; 1 Ann. St. 1. c. 15 | 6 May 1702 |
An Act to ascertain the water measure of fruit. (Repealed by Weights and Measures Act 1824 (5 Geo. 4. c. 74))
| Greenland Trade Act 1702 (repealed) | 1 Ann. c. 10; 1 Ann. St. 1. c. 16 | 6 May 1702 |
An Act for the enlarging and encouraging the Greenland trade. (Repealed by Statute Law Revision Act 1867 (30 & 31 Vict. c. 59))
| Gold and Silver Thread Act 1702 (repealed) | 1 Ann. c. 11; 1 Ann. St. 1. c. 17 | 6 May 1702 |
An Act for continuing and amending the Act, made in the Ninth Year of His late Majesty's Reign, intituled, "An Act for the settling and adjusting the Proportions of fine Silver and Silk, and for the better making of Gold and Silver Thread, and to prevent the Abuses of the Wire-drawers." (Note: Silver and Gold Thread Act 1697 (9 Will. 3. c. 39)) (Repealed by Statute Law Revision Act 1867 (30 & 31 Vict. c. 59))
| Bridges Act 1702 (repealed) | 1 Ann. c. 12; 1 Ann. St. 1. c. 18 | 6 May 1702 |
An Act to explain and alter the Act made in the two and twentieth year of King Henry the Eighth, (Note: Bridges Act 1530 (22 Hen. 8 c. 5)) concerning the repairing and amending of Bridges in the Highways and for repealing an Act made in the Twenty third year of Queen Elizabeth, (Note: Cardiff Bridge Act 1580 (23 Eliz. 1. c. 11)) for the re-edifying of Cardiffe Bridge in the County of Glamorgan; and also for changing the day of Election of the Wardens and Assistants of Rochester Bridge. (Repealed by Highways Act 1959 (7 & 8 Eliz. 2. c. 25) and London Government Act 1963 (c. 33))
| Whitby Piers Act 1702 (repealed) | 1 Ann. c. 13; 1 Ann. St. 1. c. 19 | 6 May 1702 |
An Act for the re-building and repairing the Piers of the Town and Port of Whitby, in the County of York. (Repealed by Whitby Piers and Harbour Act 1827 (7 & 8 Geo. 4. c. lxxviii))
| River Derwent Navigation Act 1702 or the Derwent (Yorkshire) Navigation Act 1702 (repealed) | 1 Ann. c. 14; 1 Ann. St. 1. c. 20 | 6 May 1702 |
An Act for making the River Darwent, in the County of Yorke, navigable. (Repealed by River Derwent Navigation Act Revocation Order 1935 (SR&O 1935/978))
| Salt Duties, etc. Act 1702 (repealed) | 1 Ann. c. 15; 1 Ann. St. 1. c. 21 | 25 May 1702 |
An Act for the preventing Frauds in the Duties upon Salt, and for the better Payment of Debentures at the Custom-house. (Repealed by Repeal of Obsolete Statutes Act 1856 (19 & 20 Vict. c. 64))
| Security of the Succession, etc. Act 1702 (repealed) | 1 Ann. c. 16; 1 Ann. St. 1. c. 22 | 25 May 1702 |
An Act to declare the Alterations in the Oath appointed to be taken by the Act, intituled, "An Act for the further Security of His Majesty's Person, and the Succession of the Crown in the Protestant Line; and for extinguishing the Hopes of the pretended Prince of Wales, and all other Pretenders, and their open and secret Abettors;" (Note: Security of the Succession, etc. Act 1701 (13 & 14 Will. 3. c. 6)) and for declaring the Association to be determined. (Repealed by Statute Law Revision Act 1867 (30 & 31 Vict. c. 59))
| Militia Act 1702 (repealed) | 1 Ann. c. 17; 1 Ann. St. 1. c. 23 | 25 May 1702 |
An Act for raising the Militia for the Year One Thousand Seven Hundred and Two, notwithstanding the Month's Pay formerly advanced be not re-paid. (Repealed by Statute Law Revision Act 1867 (30 & 31 Vict. c. 59))
| Sheriffs Act 1702 (repealed) | 1 Ann. c. 18; 1 Ann. St. 1. c. 24 | 25 May 1702 |
An Act for continuing the present Sheriffs in England and Wales until the First Day of Hillary Term next, unless Her Majesty shall think fit to determine them sooner. (Repealed for by Statute Law Revision Act 1867 (30 & 31 Vict. c. 59))
| Insolvent Debtors Relief Act 1702 (repealed) | 1 Ann. c. 19; 1 Ann. St. 1. c. 25 | 25 May 1702 |
An Act for the Relief of poor Prisoners for Debt. (Repealed by Statute Law Revision Act 1867 (30 & 31 Vict. c. 59))
| Carriage of Corn, etc. Act 1702 (repealed) | 1 Ann. c. 20; 1 Ann. St. 1. c. 26 | 25 May 1702 |
An Act for the Relief of the Masters of Hoys and other Vessels carrying Corn, and other Inland Provisions, within the Port of London. (Repealed by Customs Law Repeal Act 1825 (6 Geo. 4. c. 105))
| Importation Act 1702 (repealed) | 1 Ann. c. 21; 1 Ann. St. 1. c. 27 | 25 May 1702 |
An Act for the Importation of fine Italian Thrown Silk. (Repealed by Statute Law Revision Act 1867 (30 & 31 Vict. c. 59))
| Importation (No. 2) Act 1702 (repealed) | 1 Ann. c. 22; 1 Ann. St. 1. c. 28 | 25 May 1702 |
An Act for importing into England Thrown Silk, of the Growth of Sicily, from the Port of Legborn in Italy. (Repealed by Statute Law Revision Act 1867 (30 & 31 Vict. c. 59))
| Imprisonment of Certain Traitors Act 1702 (repealed) | 1 Ann. c. 23; 1 Ann. St. 1. c. 29 | 25 May 1702 |
An Act for continuing the Imprisonment of Counter and others, for the horrid Conspiracy to assassinate the Person of His late Sacred Majesty King William the Third. (Repealed by Statute Law Revision Act 1867 (30 & 31 Vict. c. 59))
| Protestant Children of Jews Act 1702 (repealed) | 1 Ann. c. 24; 1 Ann. St. 1. c. 30 | 25 May 1702 |
An Act to oblige the Jews to maintain and provide for their Protestant Children. (Repealed by Religious Disabilities Act 1846 (9 & 10 Vict. c. 59))
| Crown Lands, Forfeited Estates (Ireland) Act 1702 (repealed) | 1 Ann. c. 25; 1 Ann. St. 1. c. 31 | 25 May 1702 |
An Act for making more effectual the Provision out of the forfeited Estates in Ireland, for the building of Churches, and augmenting small Vicarages, in Ireland. (Repealed for Northern Ireland by Statute Law Revision Act 1950 (14 Geo. 6. c. 6))
| Purchasers of Forfeited Estates (Ireland) Act 1702 (repealed) | 1 Ann. c. 26; 1 Ann. St. 1. c. 32 | 25 May 1702 |
An Act for the relief of the Protestant purchasers of the forfeited estates in Ireland. (Repealed by Promissory Oaths Act 1871 (34 & 35 Vict. c. 48))
| Windsor Lands Act 1702 | 1 Ann. c. 27 (Note: Also listed as 1 Ann. c. 9 Pr.); 1 Ann. St. 1. c. 11 Pr. | 6 May 1702 |
An Act for confirming a Purchase made by Her Majesty and an Exchange between Her Majesty and the Deane and Canons of the Kings free Chappell within the Castle of Windsor.

=== Private acts ===
| Short title | Citation | Royal assent |
Long title
| Earl of Thomond's Estate Act 1702 | 1 Ann. c. 1 Pr. (Note: This is the citation in The Statutes of the Realm.); 1 Ann. St. 1. c. 3 Pr. (Note: This is the citation in The Statutes at Large.) | 30 March 1702 |
An Act to enable the Right Honourable Lady Henrietta O'Brien, Mother and Guardian of the Right Honourable Henry Earl of Thomond, an Infant, to make Leases of his Estate in Ireland, for the discharging of Incumbrances thereon, and of a Charge of Four Thousand Pounds for his Sister's Portion.
| Relief of Frances Countess of Tyrconnel of Ireland. | 1 Ann. c. 2 Pr. 1 Ann. St. 1. c. 4 Pr. | 30 March 1702 |
An Act for the Relief of Frances Countess of Tyrconnel, Relict of Richard late Earl of Tyrconnel, of the Kingdom of Ireland.
| Meredith's Estate Act 1702 | 1 Ann. c. 3 Pr. 1 Ann. St. 1. c. 5 Pr. | 30 March 1702 |
An Act for enabling Sir William Meredith Baronet to sell Part of a Capital Messuage, Lands, and Hereditaments, herein after mentioned, in Ashley, in the County of Chester; he having settled other Lands and Tenements in Lieu thereof.
| Purefoy's Estate Act 1702 | 1 Ann. c. 4 Pr. 1 Ann. St. 1. c. 6 Pr. | 30 March 1702 |
An Act to enable Trustees to sell certain Lands, Tithes, and Tenements, for the Payment of the Debts of Francis Purefoy Esquire deceased.
| Sale of lands in Whitchurch parish (Cheshire) for paying off incumbrances. | 1 Ann. c. 5 Pr. 1 Ann. St. 1. c. 7 Pr. | 30 March 1702 |
An Act for vesting several Messuages, Lands, and Tenements, in the Parish of Whitchurch, in the County of Chester, in Trustees, to be sold, for paying off the Incumbrances charged thereon; and for other Uses therein mentioned.
| Lee's Estate Act 1702 | 1 Ann. c. 6 Pr. 1 Ann. St. 1. c. 8 Pr. | 30 March 1702 |
An Act to enable Warner Lee, alias Warner Warner, to make a Jointure upon his Marriage.
| Wightwicke's Estate Act 1702 | 1 Ann. c. 7 Pr. 1 Ann. St. 1. c. 9 Pr. | 30 March 1702 |
An Act for the settling and vesting divers Manors and Lands of Francis Wightwick, an Infant, lying in the County of Stafford, in Trustees, to enable them to settle and convey the same, upon the Marriage of the said Francis Wightwick, to such Uses, Intents, and Purposes, as shall be agreed upon.
| Rose's Estate Act 1702 | 1 Ann. c. 8 Pr. 1 Ann. St. 1. c. 10 Pr. | 30 March 1702 |
An Act for confirming the Title of Thomas Rose Gentleman to Lands called Rempstone; and for Sale of Lands called Carrants Court, in the County of Dorsett, for Payment of the Debts of William Rose Gentleman deceased; and for settling the Manor of Cheddar Fitzwalter's, in the County of Somersett, with the Overplus on the said Sale, on Mary Rose, an Infant Daughter of the said William, in Lieu of Three Thousand Pounds Portion for the said Infant.
| Windsor Lands Act 1702 | 1 Ann. c. 9 Pr. (Note: Also listed as 1 Ann. c. 27.); 1 Ann. St. 1. c. 11 Pr. | 6 May 1702 |
An Act for confirming a Purchase made by Her Majesty and an Exchange between Her Majesty and the Deane and Canons of the Kings free Chappell within the Castle of Windsor.
| Earl of Exeter's Estate Act 1702 | 1 Ann. c. 10 Pr. 1 Ann. St. 1. c. 12 Pr. | 6 May 1702 |
An Act for the Sale of certain Manors and Lands of John late Earl of Exeter, for Payment of the Debts and Performance of the Will of the said Earl.
| Earl of Abingdon's Estate Act 1702 | 1 Ann. c. 11 Pr. 1 Ann. St. 1. c. 13 Pr. | 6 May 1702 |
An Act for vesting certain Lands and Tenements of Montagu Earl of Abingdon in Trustees, to be sold; and purchasing other Lands of equal Value; and limiting the Lands to be purchased to the same Uses as the Lands to be sold are limited.
| Relief of Dorothy Dowager Baroness of Upper Ossory and Captain James Roche with relation to the Irish forfeitures. | 1 Ann. c. 12 Pr. 1 Ann. St. 1. c. 14 Pr. | 6 May 1702 |
An Act for the Relief of Dorothy Baroness Dowager of Upper Ossory and Captain James Rocke, with relation to the Irish Forfeitures.
| Sale of Attingham Manor (Salop.) and settling Selly Hall Farm and a moiety of Temple Lawrne Manor (Worcestershire) in lieu thereof. | 1 Ann. c. 13 Pr. 1 Ann. St. 1. c. 15 Pr. | 6 May 1702 |
An Act for Sale of the Manor of Attingham, in the County of Salop; and settling a Farm called Selly-hall, and a Moiety of the Manor of Temple Lawrne, in the County of Worcester, of better Value, in Lieu thereof.
| Adams' Estate Act 1702 | 1 Ann. c. 14 Pr. 1 Ann. St. 1. c. 16 Pr. | 6 May 1702 |
An Act for charging the Estate late of William Adams Esquire, deceased, with Portions and Maintenances for William Adams and Elizabeth Adams his Younger Children.
| Soam's Estate Act 1702 | 1 Ann. c. 15 Pr. 1 Ann. St. 1. c. 17 Pr. | 6 May 1702 |
An Act for Sale of Part of the Estate of Stephen Soame Gentleman and Dorothy his Wife; and for applying the Monies raised thereby for Payment of his Debts, and for the Portions of Mary and William Soame, Two of their Younger Children.
| Apreece's Estate Act 1702 | 1 Ann. c. 16 Pr. 1 Ann. St. 1. c. 17 Pr. | 6 May 1702 |
An Act to enable Robert Apreece the Elder, and Robert Apreece the Younger, Esquires, to raise Money out of their Estate, for Payment of a Debt due to Her Majesty, and other Debts.
| Marston's Estate Act 1702 | 1 Ann. c. 17 Pr. 1 Ann. St. 1. c. 19 Pr. | 6 May 1702 |
An Act for confirming and settling of divers Charities, given by the last Will of Job Marston Gentleman, deceased.
| Relief of Thomas Keightley for forfeited estates in Ireland. | 1 Ann. c. 18 Pr. 1 Ann. St. 1. c. 20 Pr. | 6 May 1702 |
An Act for the Relief of Thomas Keightley Esquire, with relation to the forfeited Estates in Ireland.
| Palmer's Estate Act 1702 | 1 Ann. c. 19 Pr. 1 Ann. St. 1. c. 21 Pr. | 6 May 1702 |
An Act to enable Jeffrey Palmer Esquire to settle a Jointure upon Elizabeth his Wise.
| Relief of Hannah MacDonnell for forfeited estates in Ireland. | 1 Ann. c. 20 Pr. 1 Ann. St. 1. c. 22 Pr. | 6 May 1702 |
An Act for the Relief of Hannah Mac Donnel, with relation to the forfeited Estates in Ireland.
| Relief of Captain Thomas Bellew for forfeited estates in Ireland. | 1 Ann. c. 21 Pr. 1 Ann. St. 1. c. 23 Pr. | 6 May 1702 |
An Act for the Relief of Captain Thomas Bellew, with relation to the forfeited Estates in Ireland.
| Mathew's Estate Act 1702 | 1 Ann. c. 23 Pr. 1 Ann. St. 1. c. 25 Pr. | 6 May 1702 |
An Act for vesting the Estate of William Mathews Gentleman and Katherine his Wife in Trustees, to be sold, for the Purposes therein mentioned.
| Relief of Edward Singleton for forfeited estates in Ireland. | 1 Ann. c. 22 Pr. 1 Ann. St. 1. c. 24 Pr. | 6 May 1702 |
An Act for the Relief of Edward Singleton Esquire, with relation to the forfeited Estates in Ireland.
| Balsall Hospital Act 1702 | 1 Ann. c. 24 Pr. 1 Ann. St. 1. c. 26 Pr. | 6 May 1702 |
An Act for the better Government of the Hospital of Balsal, in the County of Warwick, founded by the Lady Katherine Leveson.
| Relief of Nicholas Bagenal for forfeited estates in Ireland. | 1 Ann. c. 25 Pr. 1 Ann. St. 1. c. 27 Pr. | 6 May 1702 |
An Act for the Relief of Nicholas Bagenal Esquire, with relation to the forfeited Estates in Ireland.
| Relief of Colonel Henry Lutterell for forfeited estates in Ireland. | 1 Ann. c. 26 Pr. 1 Ann. St. 1. c. 28 Pr. | 6 May 1702 |
An Act for the Relief of Colonel Henry Luttrel, with relation to the forfeited Estates in Ireland.
| Exeter Cathedral Estate Act 1702 | 1 Ann. c. 27 Pr. 1 Ann. St. 1. c. 29 Pr. | 6 May 1702 |
An Act to enable the Dean and Chapter of the Cathedral Church of St. Peter in Exeter, and their Farmers and Tenants, to make Leases of and in the Manor of Culmstock, in the County of Devon.
| Powel's Estate Act 1702 | 1 Ann. c. 28 Pr. 1 Ann. St. 1. c. 30 Pr. | 6 May 1702 |
An Act for vesting in Trustees the Estate late of Sir William Powel Baronet, deceased, for raising Portions for the Younger Children of Sir John Williams and Dame Mary his Wife, Daughter of the said Sir William Powel; and to enable William Williams, their Eldest Son, to make a Jointure to such Wife as he shall marry.
| Sale of Bedfordshire and Middlesex lands and purchasing of others to be settled to the same uses. | 1 Ann. c. 29 Pr. 1 Ann. St. 1. c. 31 Pr. | 6 May 1702 |
An Act for vesting certain Messuages and Tenements, in the Counties of Bedford and Middl'x, in Trustees, to be sold; and for purchasing Lands or Rents, to be settled to the same Uses.
| Stone's Estate Act 1702 | 1 Ann. c. 30 Pr. 1 Ann. St. 1. c. 32 Pr. | 6 May 1702 |
An Act for the more effectual Settlement of the Estate of John Stone, of Baldwin Brightwel, in the County of Oxford, Esquire, in his Family and Name.
| Bury's Estate Act 1702 | 1 Ann. c. 31 Pr. 1 Ann. St. 1. c. 33 Pr. | 6 May 1702 |
An Act to enable Trustees to make Sale of Part of the Estate of Humphry Bury, for paying off a Mortgage and a Portion charged thereupon.
| Construction of Sudbury (Suffolk) hospitals and workhouses and better employing the poor. | 1 Ann. c. 32 Pr. 1 Ann. St. 1. c. 34 Pr. | 6 May 1702 |
An Act for erecting Hospitals and Workhouses within the Town of Sudbury, in the County of Suffolk, for the better employing and maintaining the Poor thereof.
| Sale of lands in Yorkshire for raising Henrietta Tempest's portion. | 1 Ann. c. 33 Pr. 1 Ann. St. 1. c. 35 Pr. | 6 May 1702 |
An Act to vest several Lands and Tenements, in the County of York, in Trustees, to be sold, for the raising of a Portion for Henrietta Tempest, an Infant.
| Hunt's Estate Act 1702 | 1 Ann. c. 34 Pr. 1 Ann. St. 1. c. 36 Pr. | 6 May 1702 |
An Act to enable the Trustees of James Hunt Esquire, deceased, to sell Timber, for the Payment of his Debts and Legacies.
| Mansell's Estate Act 1702 | 1 Ann. c. 35 Pr. 1 Ann. St. 1. c. 37 Pr. | 6 May 1702 |
An Act to enable Edward Mansel Esquire to raise a further Sum of One Thousand Pounds, on a Mortgage of the Impropriate Rectory of Llanriddian, for Payment of Debts.
| Extending time for Lord Haversham to make his claim before the trustees for forfeited estates in Ireland. | 1 Ann. c. 36 Pr. 1 Ann. St. 1. c. 38 Pr. | 25 May 1702 |
An Act for enlarging the Time for John Lord Haversham (Note: John Thompson, 1st Baron Haversham) to make his Claim before the Trustees for the forfeited Estates in Ireland.
| Relief of Sir Thomas Domville for forfeited estates in Ireland. | 1 Ann. c. 37 Pr. 1 Ann. St. 1. c. 39 Pr. | 25 May 1702 |
An Act for the Relief of Sir Thomas Domville Baronet, with relation to the forfeited Estates in Ireland.
| Relief of Francis Earl of Carlingford against outlawries in Tipperary (Ireland). | 1 Ann. c. 38 Pr. 1 Ann. St. 1. c. 40 Pr. | 25 May 1702 |
An Act for the Relief of Francis Earl of Carlingford and others, against several Outlawries in the County of Tiperary, in Ireland.
| Making provision for Protestant children of Earl of Clanriccard and Lord Bophin. | 1 Ann. c. 39 Pr. 1 Ann. St. 1. c. 41 Pr. | 25 May 1702 |
An Act for making Provision for the Protestant Children of the Earl of Clanriccard and the Lord Bophin.
| Relief of Thomas Earl of Limerick and Euphemia Dowager Countess of Limerick for forfeited estates in Ireland. | 1 Ann. c. 40 Pr. 1 Ann. St. 1. c. 42 Pr. | 25 May 1702 |
An Act for the Relief of Thomas Earl of Lymerick, of the Kingdom of Ireland, and Eufemia Countess Dowager of Lymerick, with relation to the forfeited Estates in Ireland.
| Verdon's Estate Act 1702 | 1 Ann. c. 41 Pr. 1 Ann. St. 1. c. 43 Pr. | 25 May 1702 |
An Act to enable Rebeccah Windham to sell and dispose of an Estate, late Sarab Verdon's, in the County of Norfolke.
| Bishop of Gloucester's Estate Act 1702 | 1 Ann. c. 42 Pr. 1 Ann. St. 1. c. 44 Pr. | 25 May 1702 |
An Act to enable the Bishop of Gloucester and his Successors to make distinct and separate Leases of the Manors, Lands, and Premises, therein mentioned.
| Barnwell's Estate Act 1702 | 1 Ann. c. 43 Pr. 1 Ann. St. 1. c. 45 Pr. | 25 May 1702 |
An Act for the enabling Abraham Barnewell, to make a more ample Settlement of his Estate for the Benefit of his Family; and to sell Part thereof, for raising Portions for his Younger Children in his Lifetime, and for Payment of his Debts.
| Suffolk Place, Southwark, Improvement Act 1702 | 1 Ann. c. 44 Pr. 1 Ann. St. 1. c. 46 Pr. | 25 May 1702 |
An Act for the better Improvement of Suffolk Place, in the Borough of Southwark, in the County of Surrey.
| Window's Estate Act 1702 | 1 Ann. c. 45 Pr. 1 Ann. St. 1. c. 47 Pr. | 25 May 1702 |
An Act for settling the Estate late of John and Robert Windowe Gentlemen, deceased, upon Trustees, to be sold; and the Purchase-money applied to the Uses therein mentioned.
| Pawlett's Estate Act 1702 | 1 Ann. c. 46 Pr. 1 Ann. St. 1. c. 48 Pr. | 25 May 1702 |
An Act for vesting the Lands of Henry Pawlet, a Lunatic, in Trustees, in order to make suitable Provision for him, his next Heir, and next Relations.
| Relief of Sir Redmond Everard, Peter Fagan, and Sir Anthony Mullady's Protestant children for forfeited estates in Ireland. | 1 Ann. c. 47 Pr. 1 Ann. St. 1. c. 49 Pr. | 25 May 1702 |
An Act for the Relief of Sir Redmond Everard, Peter Fagan, and the Protestant Children of Sir Anthony Mullady deceased, with relation to the forfeited Estates in Ireland.
| Relief of William Viscount Montjoy for forfeited estates in Ireland. | 1 Ann. c. 48 Pr. 1 Ann. St. 1. c. 50 Pr. | 25 May 1702 |
An Act for the Relief of William Lord Viscount Mountjoy, of the Kingdom of Ireland, with relation to the forfeited Estates in Ireland.
| Relief of Robert Edgworth for forfeited estates in Ireland. | 1 Ann. c. 49 Pr. 1 Ann. St. 1. c. 51 Pr. | 25 May 1702 |
An Act for the Relief of Robert Edgeworth Esquire, with relation to the forfeited Estates in Ireland.
| Johnson's Estate Act 1702 | 1 Ann. c. 50 Pr. 1 Ann. St. 1. c. 52 Pr. | 25 May 1702 |
An Act for vesting several Lands in the Counties of Surrey and Sussex, the Estate of Mary Johnson, Wife of Wm. Johnson Gentleman, in Trustees, to be sold, for discharging several Mortgages, and other Debts, charged upon the Estate of the said William Johnson; and settling his Estate upon his said Wife, and her Children by him, clear of Incumbrances.
| Enlarging the time for John Hill and his wife to enter their claims before the trustees for sale of the forfeited estates in Ireland concerning a judgment against Robert Grace; relief of creditors of John Grace and the widow, Protestant children and creditors of the late Sir Patrick Trant with relation to the said forfeited estates; indemnifying the Earl of Carlingford concerning mortgage money owed by him to Sir Patrick Trant. | 1 Ann. c. 51 Pr. 1 Ann. St. 1. c. 53 Pr. | 25 May 1702 |
An Act for enlarging the Time for John Hill Esquire and his Wife to enter their Claims before the Trustees for Sale of the forfeited Estates in Ireland, with relation to a Judgement against Robert Grace; and for the Relief of the Creditors of John Grace, and the Widow, Protestant Children, and Creditors, of the late Sir Patrick Trant, with relation to the said forfeited Estates; and for the indemnifying the Earl of Carlingford, touching Mortgage-money by him owing to the said late Sir Patrick Trant.
| Relief of Edward Nugent for forfeited estates in Ireland. | 1 Ann. c. 52 Pr. 1 Ann. St. 1. c. 54 Pr. | 25 May 1702 |
An Act for the Relief of Edward Nugent Esquire, with relation to the forfeited Estates in Ireland.
| Relief of Joseph Mitchel for forfeited estates in Ireland. | 1 Ann. c. 53 Pr. 1 Ann. St. 1. c. 55 Pr. | 25 May 1702 |
An Act for the Relief of Joseph Mitchell Esquire, with relation to the forfeited Estates in Ireland.
| Relief of Dennis Molony for forfeited estates in Ireland. | 1 Ann. c. 54 Pr. 1 Ann. St. 1. c. 56 Pr. | 25 May 1702 |
An Act for the Relief of Dennis Molony Gentleman, with relation to the forfeited Estates in Ireland.
| Extending the time for Cesar Bradshaw to prosecute his claim before the trustees for the Irish forfeitures. | 1 Ann. c. 55 Pr. 1 Ann. St. 1. c. 57 Pr. | 25 May 1702 |
An Act for the enlarging the Time for Cesar Bradshaw Esquire to prosecute his Claim before the Trustees for the Irish Forfeitures.
| Relief of Jane Lavallin for forfeited estates in Ireland. | 1 Ann. c. 56 Pr. 1 Ann. St. 1. c. 58 Pr. | 25 May 1702 |
An Act for the Relief of Jane Lavallin, with relation to the forfeited Estates in Ireland.
| Relief of James Eustace, Agmondisham Vesey, George Field and Thomas Brigstock for forfeited estates in Ireland. | 1 Ann. c. 57 Pr. 1 Ann. St. 1. c. 59 Pr. | 25 May 1702 |
An Act for the Relief of James Eustace of Yeomans Town, Agmondisham Vesey Esquire, George Feild, and Thomas Brigstock, with relation to the forfeited Estates in Ireland.
| Relief of Francis Spring and other Protestant tenants of the forfeited estates in Ireland; for confirming a Protestant settlement at Portarlington and a charity at Middleton (County Cork), and relief of Alice Dowager Countess of Drogheda and Sir John Dillon. | 1 Ann. c. 58 Pr. 1 Ann. St. 1. c. 60 Pr. | 25 May 1702 |
An Act for the Relief of Francis Spring, and other Protestant Tenants of the forfeited Estates in Ireland, in respect of their Improvements; and for confirming a Protestant Settlement at Portarlington, and of a Charity at Middleton, in the County of Corke; and for Relief of Alice Countess Dowager of Drogheda, and Sir John Dillon.
| Relief of Ignatius Gold and his family for forfeited estates in Ireland. | 1 Ann. c. 59 Pr. 1 Ann. St. 1. c. 61 Pr. | 25 May 1702 |
An Act for the Relief of Ignatius Gould and his Family, with relation to the forfeited Estates in Ireland.
| Relief of Sir William Ashurst for forfeited estates in Ireland. | 1 Ann. c. 60 Pr. 1 Ann. St. 1. c. 62 Pr. | 25 May 1702 |
An Act for the Relief of Sir William Ashurst Knight, with relation to the forfeited Estates in Ireland.
| Relief of Mary Vernon for forfeited estates in Ireland. | 1 Ann. c. 61 Pr. 1 Ann. St. 1. c. 63 Pr. | 25 May 1702 |
An Act for the Relief of Mary Vernon, with relation to the forfeited Estates in Ireland.
| Relief of Katherine O'Brien and her children for forfeited estates in Ireland. | 1 Ann. c. 62 Pr. 1 Ann. St. 1. c. 64 Pr. | 25 May 1702 |
An Act for the Relief of Katherine O'Brien Widow, and her Children, with relation to the forfeited Estates in Ireland.
| Relief of William Spencer and Lord Kenmare's wife and children for forfeited estates in Ireland. | 1 Ann. c. 63 Pr. 1 Ann. St. 1. c. 65 Pr. | 25 May 1702 |
An Act for the Relief of William Spencer Esquire, and the Wife and Children of the late Lord Kenmare, of the Kingdom of Ireland, with relation to the forfeited Estates in Ireland.
| Relief of Katherine Harris or Kife for forfeited estates in Ireland. | 1 Ann. c. 64 Pr. 1 Ann. St. 1. c. 66 Pr. | 25 May 1702 |
An Act for the Relief of Katherine Harris, alias Kife, with relation to the forfeited Estates in Ireland.
| Relief of Susanna Smith for forfeited estates in Ireland. | 1 Ann. c. 65 Pr. 1 Ann. St. 1. c. 67 Pr. | 25 May 1702 |
An Act for the Relief of Susannah Smith Widow, with relation to the forfeited Estates in Ireland.
| Relief of Captain Richard Wolseley and other Protestant lessees in Ireland. | 1 Ann. c. 66 Pr. 1 Ann. St. 1. c. 68 Pr. | 25 May 1702 |
An Act for the Relief of Captain Richard Wolseley, and other Protestant Lessees in Ireland.
| Enlarging the time for Sir Stephen Fox to make his claim before the trustees for forfeited estates in Ireland. | 1 Ann. c. 67 Pr. 1 Ann. St. 1. c. 69 Pr. | 25 May 1702 |
An Act for enlarging the Time for Sir Stephen Fox Knight to make his Claim before the Trustees for the forfeited Estates in Ireland.
| Enlarging the time for Rebecca Viscountess Falkland, of Scotland, to enter her claim before the trustees for the forfeited estates in Ireland to a mortgage upon part of them. | 1 Ann. c. 68 Pr. 1 Ann. St. 1. c. 70 Pr. | 25 May 1702 |
An Act for enlarging the Time to Rebecca Viscountess Falkland, of the Kingdom of Scotland, to enter her Claim, before the Trustees for the forfeited Estates in Ireland, to a Mortgage upon Part of the said Estates.
| Exempting Arthur French and his wife Sarah from accounting to the trustees for the forfeited estates in Ireland for the personal estate of Irriel Farrel, deceased. | 1 Ann. c. 69 Pr. 1 Ann. St. 1. c. 71 Pr. | 25 May 1702 |
An Act for exempting and discharging Arthur French and Sarah his Wife, from accounting to the Trustees for the forfeited Estates in Ireland, for the Personal Estate of Iriell Farrell deceased.
| Relief of Charlotte Talbot for Forfeited Estates in Ireland Act 1702 | 1 Ann. c. 70 Pr. 1 Ann. St. 1. c. 72 Pr. | 25 May 1702 |
An Act for the Relief of Charlotte Talbot, with relation to the forfeited Estates in Ireland.
| Philip Savage's recompense for charge of outlawries and for attending the trustees for forfeited estates in Ireland. | 1 Ann. c. 71 Pr. 1 Ann. St. 1. c. 73 Pr. | 25 May 1702 |
An Act to recompense Philip Savage Esquire, for the Charge of Outlawries, and attending the Trustees for the forfeited Estates in Ireland.
| Relief of Maurice Annesley for forfeited estates in Ireland. | 1 Ann. c. 72 Pr. 1 Ann. St. 1. c. 74 Pr. | 25 May 1702 |
An Act for the Relief of Maurice Annesley, with relation to the forfeited Estates in Ireland.
| Relief of Thomas Lee and other executors of Sir John Heley and Peter Goodwin for forfeited estates in Ireland. | 1 Ann. c. 73 Pr. 1 Ann. St. 1. c. 75 Pr. | 25 May 1702 |
An Act for the Relief of Thomas Lee Esquire, and others, Executors of Sir John Hely Knight, and Peter Goodwin Esquire, with relation to the forfeited Estates in Ireland.
| Relief of Thomas and Katherine Plunkett for forfeited estates in Ireland and reversal of outlawries against John Mapas and Lawrence Fitz-Gerald. | 1 Ann. c. 74 Pr. 1 Ann. St. 1. c. 76 Pr. | 25 May 1702 |
An Act for the Relief of Thomas Plunket Gentleman, and Katherine his Wife, with relation to the forfeited Estates in Ireland; and for empowering Her Majesty to grant Writs of Error, for reversing the Outlawries against John Mapas and Lawrence Fitzgerald.
| Relief of John Ellis for forfeited estates in Ireland. | 1 Ann. c. 75 Pr. 1 Ann. St. 1. c. 77 Pr. | 25 May 1702 |
An Act for the Relief of John Ellis Esquire, with relation to the forfeited Estates in Ireland.
| Naturalization of de Bacolon, de Lannay, des Fourneaux and others. | 1 Ann. c. 76 Pr. 1 Ann. St. 1. c. 79 Pr. | 25 May 1702 |
An Act for naturalizing Thomas St. Leger De Bacalon, Joseph De Launay, Alexander de Raquet des Fourneaux, and others.
| Naturalization of Stephen Benovad, John Girard and others. | 1 Ann. c. 77 Pr. 1 Ann. St. 1. c. 80 Pr. | 25 May 1702 |
An Act for naturalizing Stephen Benovad, John Girrard, and others.
| Naturalization of Daniel Van Ryssen and others. | 1 Ann. c. 78 Pr. 1 Ann. St. 1. c. 78 Pr. | 25 May 1702 |
An Act for naturalizing Daniel Van Ryssen and others.

=== Sources ===
- Raithby, John, ed. (1963) [1821]. "1° Annæ". Statutes of the Realm. Vol. 8: The Statutes of the First to the Sixth Years of the Reign of Queen Anne (1702–1707). London: Dawsons. pp. 1–84 – via HathiTrust.
- Pickering, Danby, ed. (1764). "Anno primo Annæ. ſt. 1". The Statutes at Large. Vol. 10: From the Eighth Year of King William III to the Second Year of Queen Anne. Cambridge: Joseph Bentham. pp. 406–478 – via Internet Archive.
- Journals of the House of Commons. Vol. 13. London: His Majesty's Stationery Office. 1803. pp. 782–908 – via Google Books.
- Chronological Table of and Index to the Statutes. Vol. 1: To the End of the Session 59 Vict. Sess. 2 (1895) (13th ed.). London: Her Majesty's Stationery Office. 1896. pp. 82–83 – via Google Books.
- "Acts of the English Parliament from 1700". legislation.gov.uk. The National Archives.
- "Chronological Tables of the Private and Personal Acts: Part 6 (1702–1705)". legislation.gov.uk. The National Archives.

== 1 Ann. St. 2 ==
The first session of the 1st Parliament of Queen Anne which met from 20 October 1702 until 27 February 1703.

This session was also traditionally cited as 1 Ann. st. 2, 1 Ann. Stat. 2, 1 Ann. stat. 2, 1 Anne St. 2, 1 Anne st. 2, 1 Anne Stat. 2, 1 Anne stat. 2, 1 Anne, St. 2, 1 Anne, st. 2, 1 Anne, Stat. 2, 1 Anne, stat. 2.

=== Public acts ===
| Short title | Citation | Royal assent |
Long title
| Land Tax Act 1702 (repealed) | 1 Ann. St. 2. c. 1 | 23 December 1702 |
An Act for granting to Her Majesty a Land Tax, for carrying on the War against France and Spain. (Note: The War of the Spanish Succession.) (Repealed by Statute Law Revision Act 1867 (30 & 31 Vict. c. 59))
| Settlement on Prince George Act 1702 (repealed) | 1 Ann. St. 2. c. 2 | 27 February 1703 |
An Act to enable Her Majesty to settle a Revenue, for supporting the Dignity of his Royal Highness Prince George Hereditary of Denmarke, in case he shall survive Her Majesty. (Repealed by Statute Law Revision Act 1867 (30 & 31 Vict. c. 59))
| Taxation Act 1702 (repealed) | 1 Ann. St. 2. c. 3 | 27 February 1703 |
An Act for granting a Supply to Her Majesty, by several Duties imposed upon Malt, Mum, Cyder, and Perry. (Repealed by Statute Law Revision Act 1867 (30 & 31 Vict. c. 59))
| Taxation (No. 2) Act 1702 (repealed) | 1 Ann. St. 2. c. 4 | 27 February 1703 |
An Act for continuing the Duties upon Coals, Culm, and Cinders. (Repealed by Statute Law Revision Act 1867 (30 & 31 Vict. c. 59))
| Taxation (No. 3) Act 1702 (repealed) | 1 Ann. St. 2. c. 5 | 27 February 1703 |
An Act for granting an Aid to Her Majesty, by Sale of several Annuities at the Exchequer, for carrying on the War against France and Spain. (Repealed by Statute Law Revision Act 1867 (30 & 31 Vict. c. 59))
| Escape of Debtors from Prison Act 1702 (repealed) | 1 Ann. St. 2. c. 6 | 27 February 1703 |
An Act for the better preventing Escapes out of The Queen's Bench and Fleet Prisons. (Repealed by Public Authorities Protection Act 1893 (56 & 57 Vict. c. 61) and Statute Law Revision Act 1948 (11 & 12 Geo. 6. c. 62))
| Yarmouth Haven and Pier Repairs (Effect of Change in Corporate Name) Act 1702 (repealed) | 1 Ann. St. 2. c. 7 | 27 February 1703 |
An Act for explaining and making effectual a late Statute (Note: Great Yarmouth Haven and Pier Duties Act 1698 (10 Will. 3. c. 5)) concerning the Haven and Piers of the Borough of Great Yarmouth, and for concerning the Rights and Privileges of the said Borough. (Repealed by Statute Law Revision Act 1948 (11 & 12 Geo. 6. c. 62))
| Importation Act 1702 (repealed) | 1 Ann. St. 2. c. 8 | 27 February 1703 |
An Act for Explanation of a Clause in One Act made in the Seventh Year of His late Majesty's Reign, (Note: Taxation (No. 2) Act 1695 (7 & 8 Will. 3. c. 10)) relating to Borelaps, and to take off the additional Subsidy upon Irish Linen. (Repealed by Statute Law Revision Act 1867 (30 & 31 Vict. c. 59))
| Witnesses on Trial for Treason, etc. Act 1702 (repealed) | 1 Ann. St. 2. c. 9 | 27 February 1703 |
An Act for punishing of Accessaries to Felonies, and Receivers of stolen Goods; and to prevent the wilful burning and destroying of Ships. (Repealed by Criminal Statutes Repeal Act 1827 (7 & 8 Geo. 4. c. 27), Criminal Law (India) Act 1828 (9 Geo. 4. c. 74), Perjury Act 1911 (1 & 2 Geo. 5. c. 6) and Statute Law Revision Act 1948 (11 & 12 Geo. 6. c. 62))
| Essex Roads Act 1702 (repealed) | 1 Ann. St. 2. c. 10 | 27 February 1703 |
An Act for the better repairing and amending the Highways, from the North End of Thornwood Common to Woodford, in the County of Essex. (Repealed by Statute Law (Repeals) Act 2008 (c. 12))
| River Cam Navigation Act 1702 (repealed) | 1 Ann. St. 2. c. 11 | 27 February 1703 |
An Act for making the River Cham, alias Grant, in the County of Cambridge, more navigable, from Hyth-Ferry to The Queen's Mill, in the University and Town of Cambridge. (Repealed by River Cam Navigation Act 1851 (14 & 15 Vict. c. xcii))
| Completing Saint Paul's etc. Act 1702 | 1 Ann. St. 2. c. 12 | 27 February 1703 |
An Act for the finishing and adorning the Cathedral Church of St. Paul's, London.
| Continuance of Laws Act 1702 (repealed) | 1 Ann. St. 2. c. 13 | 27 February 1703 |
An Act for continuing former Acts, for exporting Leather, and for Ease of Jurors; and for reviving and making more effectual an Act relating to Vagrants. (Repealed by Statute Law Revision Act 1867 (30 & 31 Vict. c. 59))
| Distillation, etc. Act 1702 (repealed) | 1 Ann. St. 2. c. 14 | 27 February 1703 |
An Act for encouraging the Consumption of Malted Corn, and for the better preventing the Running of French and Foreign Brandy. (Repealed by Statute Law Revision Act 1867 (30 & 31 Vict. c. 59))
| Militia (No. 2) Act 1702 (repealed) | 1 Ann. St. 2. c. 15 (Note: This is the citation in The Statutes of the Realm.); 1 Ann. St. 2. c. 23 (Note: This is the citation in The Statutes at Large.) | 27 February 1703 |
An Act for the raising the Militia of this Kingdom for the Year One Thousand Seven Hundred and Three, notwithstanding the Month's Pay formerly advanced be not re-paid. (Repealed by Statute Law Revision Act 1867 (30 & 31 Vict. c. 59))
| Edward Whitaker, Public Accountant Act 1702 (repealed) | 1 Ann. St. 2. c. 16; 1 Ann. St. 2. c. 24 | 27 February 1703 |
An Act to oblige Edward Whitaker to accompt for such Sums of Public Money as hath been received by him. (Repealed by Statute Law Revision Act 1867 (30 & 31 Vict. c. 59))
| Taxation (No. 4) Act 1702 (repealed) | 1 Ann. St. 2. c. 17; 1 Ann. St. 2. c. 15 | 27 February 1703 |
An Act for granting to Her Majesty several Subsidies, for carrying on the War against France and Spain. (Repealed by Statute Law Revision Act 1867 (30 & 31 Vict. c. 59))
| Crown Lands, Forfeited Estates (Ireland) Act 1702 (repealed) | 1 Ann. St. 2. c. 18; 1 Ann. St. 2. c. 21 | 27 February 1703 |
An Act for advancing the Sale of the forfeited Estates in Ireland; and for vesting such as remain unsold by the present Trustees in Her Majesty, Her Heirs and Successors, for such Uses as the same were before vested in the said Trustees; and for the more effectual selling and setting the said Estates to Protestants; and for explaining the several Acts relating to the Lord Bophin and Sir Redmond Everard. (Repealed for Northern Ireland by Crown Lands (Forfeited Estates) (Ireland) Act 1778 (18 Geo. 3. c. 61), Crown Lands (Ireland) Act 1827 (7 & 8 Geo. 4. c. 68) and Statute Law Revision Act 1950 (14 Geo. 6. c. 6))
| Stamps Act 1702 (repealed) | 1 Ann. St. 2. c. 19; 1 Ann. St. 2. c. 22 | 27 February 1703 |
An Act for preventing Frauds in Her Majesty's Duties upon stampt Vellum, Parchment, and Paper. (Repealed by Inland Revenue Repeal Act 1870 (33 & 34 Vict. c. 99))
| Mutiny Act 1702 (repealed) | 1 Ann. St. 2. c. 20; 1 Ann. St. 2. c. 16 | 27 February 1703 |
An Act for punishing Officers and Soldiers who shall mutiny, or desert Her Majesty's Service, in England or Ireland; and for punishing false Musters; and for better Payment of Quarters in England. (Repealed by Statute Law Revision Act 1867 (30 & 31 Vict. c. 59))
| Treason Act 1702 | 1 Ann. St. 2. c. 21; 1 Ann. St. 2. c. 17 | 27 February 1703 |
An Act for enlarging the Time for taking the Oath of Abjuration; and also for re-capacitating and indemnifying such Persons as have not taken the same by the Time limited, and shall take the same by a Time to be appointed; and for the further Security of Her Majesty's Person, and the Succession of the Crown in the Protestant Line; and for extinguishing the Hopes of the pretended Prince of Wales, and all other Pretenders, and their open and secret Abettors.
| Woollen Manufactures Act 1702 (repealed) | 1 Ann. St. 2. c. 22; 1 Ann. St. 2. c. 18 | 27 February 1703 |
An Act for the more effectual preventing the Abuses and Frauds of Persons employed in the working up the Woollen, Linen, Fustian, Cotton, and Iron Manufactures of this Kingdom. (Repealed by Master and Servant Act 1889 (52 & 53 Vict. c. 24))
| Public Accounts Act 1702 (repealed) | 1 Ann. St. 2. c. 23; 1 Ann. St. 2. c. 19 | 27 February 1703 |
An Act for taking, examining, and stating, the Public Accompts of the Kingdom. (Repealed by Statute Law Revision Act 1867 (30 & 31 Vict. c. 59))
| Debts Due to the Army Act 1702 (repealed) | 1 Ann. St. 2. c. 24; 1 Ann. St. 2. c. 20 | 27 February 1703 |
An Act for reviving and continuing the late Acts, for appointing Commissioners, to take, examine, and determine, the Debts due to the Army, and for Transport Service; and also an Account of the Prizes taken during the late War. (Repealed by Statute Law Revision Act 1867 (30 & 31 Vict. c. 59))

=== Private acts ===
| Short title | Citation | Royal assent |
Long title
| Marsham's Estate Act 1702 | 1 Ann. St. 2. c. 1 Pr. | 23 December 1702 |
An Act for rectifying a Mistake in a late Act, intituled, (Note: 12 & 13 Will. 3. c. 5 Pr.) An Act to enable Sir Robert Marsham, Knight and Baronet, to dispose of Lands in Hertfordshire; and to settle other Lands, of better Value, in Kent, to the same Uses as the Lands in Hertfordshire are settled.
| Peachey's Estate Act 1702 | 1 Ann. St. 2. c. 2 Pr. | 23 December 1702 |
An Act for Sale of Part of the Estate late of William Peachy Esquire deceased, for Payment of Legacies charged thereupon.
| Duke of Beaufort's Estate Act 1702 | 1 Ann. St. 2. c. 3 Pr. | 27 February 1703 |
An Act for settling divers Manors, Lands, and Hereditaments, the Estate of Henry Duke of Beaufort, according to Agreements made upon his Marriage, and for other Purposes in the said Act mentioned.
| Brograve's Estate Act 1702 | 1 Ann. St. 2. c. 4 Pr. | 27 February 1703 |
An Act to vest divers Lands and Tenements of Sir Thomas Brograve Baronet, in the County of Hertford, in Trustees, to be sold; and to settle other Lands and Tenements in Lieu thereof.
| Bishopric of Chichester's Estate Act 1702 | 1 Ann. St. 2. c. 5 Pr. | 27 February 1703 |
An Act for giving further Time to John Lord Bishop of Chichester and his Successors to make Leases of certain Houses and Ground, in or near Chancery Lane, belonging to the Bishopric of Chichester.
| Williams' Estate Act 1702 | 1 Ann. St. 2. c. 6 Pr. | 27 February 1703 |
An Act to enable Sir Edward Williams to sell certain Manors and Lands, in the Counties of Brecon and Radnor, for Payment of Debts.
| Way from Chancery Lane to Lincoln's Inn Fields | 1 Ann. St. 2. c. 7 Pr. | 27 February 1703 |
An Act for the better collecting the Duties granted for making the Way out of Chancery-Lane into Lincolne's-Inn-Fields; and for determining the said Duties, when the Parties concerned are paid.
| Fane's Estate Act 1702 | 1 Ann. St. 2. c. 8 Pr. | 27 February 1703 |
An Act to enable the surviving Trustees and Executors of the last Will and Testament of Thomas Fane Esquire, deceased, to pay an Annuity unto Mildmay Fane Esquire, for his Maintenance and Education, until he shall attain his Age of One and Twenty Years.
| Viscount Cashels' Estate Act 1702 | 1 Ann. St. 2. c. 9 Pr. | 27 February 1703 |
An Act to enable Richard Lord Bulkeley, Viscount Cashells in the Kingdom of Ireland, and Richard Bulkeley Esquire his Son, to make a Settlement, upon the Marriage of the said Richard Bulkeley.
| Fowler's Estate Act 1702 | 1 Ann. St. 2. c. 10 Pr. | 27 February 1703 |
An Act for confirming and establishing a Partition, made by Sir Edmund Fowler Knight and Dame Anne his Wife, and Elizabeth Buggin Widow, of certain Manors and Lands, in the County of Kent, in the Year One Thousand Six Hundred Thirty-four.
| Gloucester Governor and Guardians of the Poor Act 1702 | 1 Ann. St. 2. c. 11 Pr. | 27 February 1703 |
An Act for incorporating certain Persons, for the better providing for and setting the Poor on Work in the City of Gloucester.
| Hacket's Estate Act 1702 | 1 Ann. St. 2. c. 12 Pr. | 27 February 1703 |
An Act for enabling Andrew Hackett Esquire to dispose of several Messuages and Lands, in the Counties of Stafford and Warwick, and City of Lichfield, for making Provision for his Younger Children, upon settling another Estate, in Stroxton, in the County of Lincoln, of better Value, to the same Uses as the Messuages and Lands in the Counties of Stafford and Warwick, and City of Lichfield, were settled.
| Castleman's Estate Act 1702 | 1 Ann. St. 2. c. 13 Pr. | 27 February 1703 |
An Act for making Provision for the Younger Children of Jonathan Castelman, of Coubertly, in the County of Gloucester, Esquire, for supplying an Omission in his Father's Will, of a Power for making Leases.
| Stawell's Estate Act 1702 | 1 Ann. St. 2. c. 14 Pr. | 27 February 1703 |
An Act to enable William Coleman Esquire, and others, to make Sale of Lands, for Payment of the Debts and Legacies of William Stawell Esquire, deceased.
| Cowper's Estate Act 1702 | 1 Ann. St. 2. c. 15 Pr. | 27 February 1703 |
An Act for the vesting of the several Manors, Messuages, Lands, and Hereditaments, in the County of Essex, late belonging to John Cowper Gentleman, deceased, in Trustees, to be sold, for better Payment of his Debts, and Legacies charged thereon.
| Goddard's Estate Act 1702 | 1 Ann. St. 2. c. 16 Pr. | 27 February 1703 |
An Act for the better settling the Real and Personal Estate of John Goddard Esquire deceased, to and for the Benefit of John Goddard his Son and Mary Goddard his Daughter, Infants, during their Minority.
| Confirmation of the division of a third part of manor of Burton Dassett (Warwickshire). | 1 Ann. St. 2. c. 17 Pr. | 27 February 1703 |
An Act for confirming the Division of the Third Part of Burton Dasset, in the County of Warwick, heretofore made by the Owners thereof.
| Hoare's Estate Act 1702 | 1 Ann. St. 2. c. 18 Pr. | 27 February 1703 |
An Act to enable the Executrix of James Hoare Esquire, deceased, to pay a Sum of Money, in Discharge of a Trust in her reposed by his Will.
| Aldworth's Estate Act 1702 | 1 Ann. St. 2. c. 19 Pr. | 27 February 1703 |
An Act to enable Charles Aldworth Esquire to sell Lands and Tenements, for Payment of his Father's Debts and his Sisters Portions.
| Morris' Estate Act 1702 | 1 Ann. St. 2. c. 20 Pr. | 27 February 1703 |
An Act for Sale of Part of the Estate of Charles Morris Esquire, for the Payment of Debts charged thereupon, and for the making Provision for his Younger Children.
| Improvement of a piece of ground in St. Martin-in-the-Fields parish for use of the poor and for other purposes. | 1 Ann. St. 2. c. 21 Pr. | 27 February 1703 |
An Act for the better improving a certain Piece of Ground, in the Parish of St. Martin's in the Fields, for the Use of the Poor; and for other the Purposes therein mentioned.
| Supple's Estate Act 1702 | 1 Ann. St. 2. c. 22 Pr. | 27 February 1703 |
An Act to enable the Devisees of James Supple, and all claiming under them, to make Leases, for the Improvement of the Estate devised.
| Exchange of lands in Brampton (Northamptonshire) for lands in Wickham (Lincolnshire). | 1 Ann. St. 2. c. 23 Pr. | 27 February 1703 |
An Act concerning the Exchange of Lands, lying in or near Brampton, in the County of Northampton, for Lands lying in or near Wickham, in the County of Lincoln.
| Loane's Estate Act 1702 | 1 Ann. St. 2. c. 24 Pr. | 27 February 1703 |
An Act for the better Execution of the Will of John Lone Esquire, deceased; and for Sale of Part of his Estate, to pay his Debts and Legacies, for preserving the Residue thereof.
| Vesey's Estate Act 1702 | 1 Ann. St. 2. c. 25 Pr. | 27 February 1703 |
An Act for Sale of divers Lands, in the County of Kildare and Kingdom of Ireland (being the Estate of Agmondisham Vesey Esquire, and his Two Daughters Anne Vesey and Henrietta Vesey), for the paying of Debts, and clearing Incumbrances charged thereon; and also for empowering the said Agmondisham Vesey to make Leases, for any Term not exceeding One and Twenty Years.
| Loane's Estate Act 1702 | 1 Ann. St. 2. c. 26 Pr. | 27 February 1703 |
An Act for Sale of several Estates, for Payment of Debts charged thereupon; for disposing of the Residue of the Money at Interest, for the Benefit of Giles Loane, and other Infants, pursuant to their Father's Will.
| Arderne's Estate Act 1702 | 1 Ann. St. 2. c. 27 Pr. | 27 February 1703 |
An Act to enable John Arderne Esquire to pay his Father's Debts, and make Provision for his Brothers and Sister.
| Caldecot's Estate Act 1702 | 1 Ann. St. 2. c. 28 Pr. | 27 February 1703 |
An Act for raising Fifteen Hundred Pounds, by Mortgage of Lands in the County of Dorset, for Payment of Debts, and for a further Provision and Maintenance for the Younger Children of Philip Caldecot Esquire.
| Lister's Estate Act 1702 | 1 Ann. St. 2. c. 29 Pr. | 27 February 1703 |
An Act for charging the Estate late of Thomas Lyster Esquire, deceased, with Maintenances for his Nine Younger Children.
| Setting aside a settlement in order that William Butler may have a good conveyance of lands from Raphael Whistler. | 1 Ann. St. 2. c. 30 Pr. | 27 February 1703 |
An Act for setting aside a Settlement, in order that William Butler may have a good Conveyance of Lands from Raphael Whistler, according to Articles agreed on.
| Owen's Estate Act 1702 | 1 Ann. St. 2. c. 31 Pr. | 27 February 1703 |
An Act for vesting divers Lands and Tenements, of Edward Owen, of Eaton Mascot, in the County of Salop, in Trustees, to be sold, for Payment of his Debts.
| Hodson's Estate Act 1702 | 1 Ann. St. 2. c. 32 Pr. | 27 February 1703 |
An Act for vesting certain Messuages, Lands, and Hereditaments, of Toby Hodson the Elder, Esquire, a Lunatic, in Trustees, for Payment of his Debts, and making Provision for himself, his Wife, and only Son.
| Naturalization of Nicholas Wayfoort, Peter Le Blanc and Jacob Sanderfelt. | 1 Ann. St. 2. c. 33 Pr. | 27 February 1703 |
An Act for naturalizing Nicholaus Wayfoord, Peter Le Blanck, and Jacob Saunderfelt.

=== Sources ===
- Raithby, John, ed. (1963) [1821]. "1° Annæ Stat. 2". Statutes of the Realm. Vol. 8: The Statutes of the First to the Sixth Years of the Reign of Queen Anne (1702–1707). London: Dawsons. pp. 85–225 – via HathiTrust.
- Pickering, Danby, ed. (1764). "Anno primo Annæ. ſt. 2". The Statutes at Large. Vol. 10: From the Eighth Year of King William III to the Second Year of Queen Anne. Cambridge: Joseph Bentham. pp. 478–511 – via Internet Archive.
- Journals of the House of Commons. Vol. 14. London: His Majesty's Stationery Office. 1803. pp. 2–210 – via Google Books.
- Chronological Table of and Index to the Statutes. Vol. 1: To the End of the Session 59 Vict. Sess. 2 (1895) (13th ed.). London: Her Majesty's Stationery Office. 1896. p. 83 – via Google Books.
- "Acts of the English Parliament from 1700". legislation.gov.uk. The National Archives.
- "Chronological Tables of the Private and Personal Acts: Part 6 (1702–1705)". legislation.gov.uk. The National Archives.

== See also ==
- List of acts of the Parliament of England
