= Barbed Wire Act 1893 =

Act of the Parliament of the United Kingdom

Barbed Wire Act 1893 (Note: Section 1.)
- Act of Parliament
- Parliament of the United Kingdom
- Long title: An Act to prevent the use of Barbed Wire for Fences in Roads, Streets, Lanes, and other Thoroughfares.
- Citation: 56 & 57 Vict. c. 32
- Territorial extent: United Kingdom

Dates
- Royal assent: 27 July 1893
- Commencement: 27 July 1893 (Note: The Acts of Parliament (Commencement) Act 1793.)
- Repealed: England and Wales: 31 July 1963; Scotland: 1 January 1985; Northern Ireland: 1 January 1982 (Note: The Roads (1980 Order) (Commencement) Order (Northern Ireland) 1981 (SI 1981/397).)
Other legislation
Amended by	Local Government Act 1933
Repealed by	England and Wales: Highways Act 1959 and London Government Act 1963; Scotland: Roads (Scotland) Act 1984; Northern Ireland: Roads (Northern Ireland) Order 1980

Status: Repealed

Text of statute as originally enacted

The Barbed Wire Act 1893 (56 & 57 Vict. c. 32) was an act of the Parliament of the United Kingdom.

The act provided that where barbed wire was placed adjoining a highway in such a manner as to pose a danger to people or animals using the highway, then the local authority was empowered to demand its removal; if the owner of the wire failed to remove it, the council could apply for a court order, and if this failed it was empowered to remove the wire and charge any expenses to the owner.

== Subsequent developments ==
The whole act was repealed for England and Wales, except for London, by section 312(2) of, and the twenty-fifth schedule to, the Highways Act 1959 (7 & 8 Eliz. 2. c. 25), which came into force on 1 January 1960.
