= Highways Act 1959 =

Act of the Parliament of the United Kingdom

Highways Act 1959 (Note: Section 313(1).)
- Act of Parliament
- Parliament of the United Kingdom
- Long title: An Act to consolidate with amendments certain enactments relating to highways, streets and bridges in England and Wales, including certain enactments commonly contained in local Acts, and to make consequential amendments of the common law.
- Citation: 7 & 8 Eliz. 2. c. 25
- Territorial extent: England and Wales (Note: Section 313(3) and (4). The act did not extend to Scotland or Northern Ireland. Certain provisions extended to London under sections 291 and 312(3).)

Dates
- Royal assent: 30 April 1959
- Commencement: 1 January 1960 (Note: Section 313(2).)
- Repealed: 1 January 1981
Other legislation
Amends	See § Repealed enactments
Repeals/revokes	See § Repealed enactments
Amended by	Road Traffic Act 1960; Land Compensation Act 1961; Town and Country Planning Act 1962; Highways (Amendment) Act 1965; Local Government Act 1966; General Rate Act 1967; National Loans Act 1968; Courts Act 1971; Statute Law (Repeals) Act 1974; Statute Law (Repeals) Act 1977
Repealed by	Highways Act 1980

Status: Repealed

Text of statute as originally enacted

The Highways Act 1959 (7 & 8 Eliz. 2. c. 25) was an act of the Parliament of the United Kingdom that consolidated enactments relating to highways, streets and bridges in England and Wales.

== Provisions ==
=== Repealed enactments ===
Section 312(2) of the act repealed 77 enactments, listed in the twenty-fifth schedule to the act.

Citation	Short title	Description	Extent of repeal
22 Hen. 8. c. 5	Bridges Act 1530	Bridges Act, 1530.	The whole act.
1 Anne c. 12 (Note: This is the citation in The Statutes of the Realm.)	Bridges Act 1702	Bridges Act, 1702.	The whole act.
12 Geo. 2. c. 29	County Rates Act 1738	County Rates Act, 1738.	The whole act.
14 Geo. 2. c. 33	Bridges Act 1740	Bridges Act, 1740.	The whole act.
13 Geo. 3. c. 78	Highways Act 1773	An Act to explain, amend and reduce into one Act of Parliament the Statutes now in being for the Amendment and Preservation of the Public Highways within that part of Great Britain called England; and for other purposes.	The whole act.
43 Geo. 3. c. 59	Bridges Act 1803	Bridges Act, 1803.	The whole act.
52 Geo. 3. c. 110	Bridges Act 1812	Bridges Act, 1812.	The whole act.
54 Geo. 3. c. 90	Bridges Act 1814	Bridges Act, 1814.	The whole act.
55 Geo. 3. c. 143	Bridges Act 1815	Bridges Act, 1815.	The whole act.
3 Geo. 4. c. 126	Turnpike Roads Act 1822	Turnpike Roads Act, 1822.	Sections ninety-seven to one hundred and three, one hundred and eighteen and one hundred and twenty-four.
5 & 6 Will. 4. c. 50	Highway Act 1835	Highway Act, 1835.	In section five, the words "or waywarden", the definition of "parish", the words from "and wherever anything" to "meeting in vestry", the definitions of "church" and "inhabitant" and the words from "and all the powers" to the end. Sections nineteen to twenty-one. In section twenty-two, the words from the beginning to "therewith" and the words from "the said" to the end. Sections twenty-three to twenty-six. Sections thirty-five, forty-one, forty-five, forty-seven and forty-nine. Sections fifty-one to seventy. In section seventy-two, the words from "or shall cause" to "highway" where it last occurs. Sections seventy-three and seventy-five. In section seventy-eight, the words from "and every such driver" to the end. Sections seventy-nine to ninety-six. Section ninety-nine. In section one hundred and three, the words "and all balances due from a surveyor". Sections one hundred and eleven, one hundred and thirteen, one hundred and sixteen, one hundred and seventeen and one hundred and eighteen. The Schedule.
4 & 5 Vict. c. 51	Highway Act 1841	Highway Act, 1841.	The whole act.
8 & 9 Vict. c. 118	Inclosure Act 1845	Inclosure Act, 1845.	In section seventy-two, the words from "and shall apply" to the end.
10 & 11 Vict. c. 34	Towns Improvement Clauses Act 1847	Towns Improvement Clauses Act, 1847.	Sections forty-eight and forty-nine. Sections sixty-six to seventy-four. In section seventy-five, the words "to passengers or", the words from "shall immediately" to "passengers and" and the words "of putting up every such fence and". Sections seventy-nine to eighty-three.
23 & 24 Vict. c. 68	South Wales Highways Act 1860	South Wales Highways Act, 1860.	The whole act.
25 & 26 Vict. c. 61	Highway Act 1862	Highway Act, 1862.	The whole act.
27 & 28 Vict. c. 101	Highway Act 1864	Highway Act, 1864.	The whole act except sections one and forty-six. In section forty-six, the words from "and no justice" to the end.
28 & 29 Vict. c. 107	Annual Turnpike Acts Continuance Act 1865	Annual Turnpike Acts Continuance Act, 1865.	The whole act.
33 & 34 Vict. c. 73	Annual Turnpike Acts Continuance Act 1870	Annual Turnpike Acts Continuance Act, 1870.	The whole act.
33 & 34 Vict. c. 78	Tramways Act 1870	Tramways Act, 1870.	In section four, the words from "or of the road authority" to "Highway Acts".
35 & 36 Vict. c. 85	Annual Turnpike Acts Continuance Act 1872	Annual Turnpike Acts Continuance Act, 1872.	In section thirteen, the words from "and in other cases" to the end.
38 & 39 Vict. c. 55	Public Health Act 1875	Public Health Act, 1875.	Sections twenty-six, one hundred and forty-four, one hundred and forty-six and one hundred and forty-seven. In section one hundred and forty-eight, the words "maintenance repair". Sections one hundred and forty-nine to one hundred and fifty-two, one hundred and fifty-four, one hundred and fifty-five, one hundred and fifty-seven and one hundred and fifty-eight. In section one hundred and sixty, paragraphs (2) to (4) and the words from "Notices" to the end. Sections two hundred and thirteen to two hundred and fifteen, two hundred and eighteen to two hundred and twenty-three, two hundred and twenty-five, two hundred and twenty-six, two hundred and thirty-two, two hundred and thirty-four, two hundred and forty, two hundred and forty-one, two hundred and fifty-six, two hundred and fifty-seven and two hundred and sixty-eight. In the Fourth Schedule, Form G. In the Fifth Schedule, so much of Part III as re-enacts 26 & 27 Vict. c. 17. s. 6.
40 & 41 Vict. c. 14	Evidence Act 1877	Evidence Act, 1877.	In section one, the words "the non-repair of any public highway or bridge or for".
41 & 42 Vict. c. 34	South Wales Highway Act Amendment Act 1878	South Wales Highway Act Amendment Act, 1878.	The whole act.
41 & 42 Vict. c. 77	Highways and Locomotives (Amendment) Act 1878	Highways and Locomotives (Amendment) Act, 1878.	Part I except section twenty-six, and in section twenty-six paragraph (4). Section thirty-four. In section thirty-six, the words "this Act or". Section thirty-eight, except so far as it defines "the metropolis" and "person".
43 & 44 Vict. c. 5	County Bridges Loans Extension Act 1880	County Bridges Loans Extension Act, 1880.	The whole act.
44 & 45 Vict. c. 14	South Wales Bridges Act 1881	South Wales Bridges Act, 1881.	The whole act.
45 & 46 Vict. c. 27	Highway Rate Assessment and Expenditure Act 1882	Highway Rate Assessment and Expenditure Act, 1882.	Section six.
45 & 46 Vict. c. 50	Municipal Corporations Act 1882	Municipal Corporations Act, 1882.	Section one hundred and nineteen. In the Ninth Schedule, the references to the South Wales Highways Act 1860, the Highway Act 1862, and the Highways and Locomotives (Amendment) Act 1878.
45 & 46 Vict. c. 52	Annual Turnpike Acts Continuance Act 1882	Annual Turnpike Acts Continuance Act, 1882.	In section eight, the definition of "highway authority".
45 & 46 Vict. c. 67	South Wales Turnpike Roads Amendment Act 1882	South Wales Turnpike Roads Amendment Act, 1882.	The whole act.
48 & 49 Vict. c. 13	Highway Act Amendment Act 1885	Highway Act Amendment Act, 1885.	The whole act.
51 & 52 Vict. c. 25	Railway and Canal Traffic Act 1888	Railway and Canal Traffic Act, 1888.	In section sixteen, subsection (3). In section fifty-four, in subsection (3), the words "if other than a surveyor of highways".
51 & 52 Vict. c. 41	Local Government Act 1888	Local Government Act, 1888.	In section three, paragraph (viii). Section six. In section eleven, subsections (1), (2), (9), (10) and (13) and in subsection (12) the words from the beginning to "council and". Sections twelve and thirteen. In section thirty-four, subsection (2). In section thirty-five, subsections (3) and (4). In section thirty-eight, paragraph (d) of subsection (2), and subsections (3) and (4). Section ninety-seven. In section one hundred, the definition of "highway authority".
51 & 52 Vict. c. 52	Public Health (Buildings in Streets) Act 1888	Public Health (Buildings in Streets) Act, 1888.	The whole act.
53 & 54 Vict. c. 59	Public Health Acts Amendment Act 1890	Public Health Acts Amendment Act, 1890.	In section seven, subsection (2). In section eleven, subsection (2). Sections thirteen, fourteen, fifteen, thirty-four, thirty-five, thirty-nine, forty-one and forty-three.
54 & 55 Vict. c. 63	Highways and Bridges Act 1891	Highways and Bridges Act, 1891.	The whole act.
55 & 56 Vict. c. 57	Private Street Works Act 1892	Private Street Works Act, 1892.	The whole act.
56 & 57 Vict. c. 32	Barbed Wire Act 1893	Barbed Wire Act, 1893.	The whole act.
56 & 57 Vict. c. 73	Local Government Act 1894	Local Government Act, 1894.	In section eight, paragraph (g) of subsection (1) in so far as it applies to a highway within the meaning of the Highways Act, 1959.
7 Edw. 7. c. 53	Public Health Acts Amendment Act 1907	Public Health Acts Amendment Act, 1907.	Section thirteen.
9 Edw. 7. c. 47	Development and Road Improvement Funds Act 1909	Development and Road Improvement Funds Act, 1909.	In section sixteen, subsection (1) so far as regards functions of a rural district council which are functions under this Act, and the words in that subsection from "or that" to "manner".
9 & 10 Geo. 5. c. 50	Ministry of Transport Act 1919	Ministry of Transport Act, 1919.	In section nineteen, in paragraph (8), the words from "with", where it first occurs, to "expense and".
10 & 11 Geo. 5. c. 72	Roads Act 1920	Roads Act, 1920.	In section twenty-five, subsections (2) and (3). In section twenty-six, subsections (1), (4), (5) and (6). Section eighty-two. In section seven, subsection (1).
14 & 15 Geo. 5. c. 34	London Traffic Act 1924	London Traffic Act, 1924.	Sections fifteen to twenty, twenty-two and twenty-eight to thirty. In section thirty-one the words from "is owing" to "passengers or". Sections thirty-two, thirty-three and ninety-five.
15 & 16 Geo. 5. c. 18	Settled Land Act 1925	Settled Land Act, 1925.	Part I. In section nineteen, in subsection (1), the words "or Part II" and the proviso.
15 & 16 Geo. 5. c. 24	Universities and College Estates Act 1925	Universities and College Estates Act, 1925.	Section ten. The First Schedule so far as it amends any enactment repealed by this Act.
15 & 16 Geo. 5. c. 49	Supreme Court of Judicature (Consolidation) Act 1925	Supreme Court of Judicature (Consolidation) Act, 1925.	Sections four and five. Section eleven. In section sixteen, the definition of "undertakers". In section fifty-six, paragraph (c) of subsection (3).
15 & 16 Geo. 5. c. 68	Roads Improvement Act 1925	Roads Improvement Act, 1925.	In section sixteen, paragraph (c) of subsection (3). In section twenty-nine, the words "non-repair or". The whole act.
15 & 16 Geo. 5. c. 71	Public Health Act 1925	Public Health Act, 1925.	In section three, the proviso. Section thirteen. In section sixteen, in subsection (1), the words from "nor shall" to the end. Sections twenty-one to twenty-five and twenty-seven to thirty-five. Section seventy-seven. Sections eighty-one to eighty-four. The First Schedule. The Second Schedule except so far as it relates to sections seventeen to nineteen of that Act.
15 & 16 Geo. 5. c. xiii	Isle of Wight Highways Act 1925	Isle of Wight Highways Act, 1925.	In section two, the definition of "main road". In section three, subsection (1), in subsection (2), the references to sections one hundred and forty-four, one hundred and fifty-five and two hundred and sixty-eight of the Public Health Act 1875, and the Public Health (Buildings in Streets) Act 1888, and subsections (3) and (4), except in so far as they relate to any enactment passed before the commencement of this Act and not repealed thereby. Sections four, nine, ten and eleven. In section twelve, paragraphs (2), (3) and (4). Sections thirteen, fourteen and fifteen. In section nineteen, subsection (1). Sections twenty and twenty-one.
17 & 18 Geo. 5. c. 23	Crown Lands Act 1927	Crown Lands Act, 1927.	In section eleven, subsection (3).
19 & 20 Geo. 5. c. 17	Local Government Act 1929	Local Government Act, 1929.	Section twenty-nine. Section thirty except subsection (2) and except subsection (3) so far as it relates to functions under the enactments mentioned in Parts I and II of the First Schedule to that Act. Section thirty-one except subsection (5) so far as it relates to functions under the enactment mentioned in Part V of the said First Schedule. Sections thirty-two to thirty-nine. Section one hundred and eighteen. In section one hundred and twenty-nine, subsection (2). In the First Schedule, Part I except so far as it relates to section one hundred and forty-eight of the Public Health Act 1875, Parts I and V except so far as they relate to section forty of the Public Health Acts Amendment Act 1890, and Parts II and IV. In the Tenth Schedule, paragraphs 2 and 10.
19 & 20 Geo. 5. c. 33	Bridges Act 1929	Bridges Act, 1929.	The whole act.
20 & 21 Geo. 5. c. 43	Road Traffic Act 1930	Road Traffic Act, 1930.	Sections fifty-one to fifty-six. In section fifty-seven, subsections (1) and (2). Section fifty-eight. In section one hundred and twenty-one, in subsection (2), the words from "other than the section" to "traffic".
22 & 23 Geo. 5. c. 45	Rights of Way Act 1932	Rights of Way Act, 1932.	The whole act.
24 & 25 Geo. 5. c. 50	Road Traffic Act 1934	Road Traffic Act, 1934.	Section twenty-three. The Third Schedule, so far as it amends subsection (2) of section fifty-seven of the Road Traffic Act 1930.
25 & 26 Geo. 5. c. 47	Restriction of Ribbon Development Act 1935	Restriction of Ribbon Development Act, 1935.	Sections four, thirteen, fourteen and eighteen. The Fourth Schedule.
1 Edw. 8 & 1 Geo. 6. c. 5	Trunk Roads Act 1936	Trunk Roads Act, 1936.	Sections one and two. In section three, in subsection (1), the words from "and any functions" to "local Act" and the remainder of that subsection so far as it relates to functions under any enactment repealed by this Act, subsection (2), so far as it relates to functions mentioned in Part II of the Third Schedule to that Act, and subsections (4) to (7). Sections four and five. In section six, subsections (1) to (4), (8) and (9) and in subsection (7) the words from the beginning to "subways) and" and the word "respectively". Sections seven and eight. Sections ten and eleven. In section thirteen, in subsection (1), the definitions of "classified road", "former highway authority", "improvement", "property", and "statutory undertakers". The First Schedule. The Second Schedule except so far as it relates to sections forty-seven and forty-eight of the Road Traffic Act 1930, and section thirty of the Road and Rail Traffic Act, 1933. In the Third Schedule, Part I except so far as it relates to section one hundred and forty-eight of the Public Health Act 1875, section forty-six of the Road Traffic Act 1930, and sections one and eighteen of the Road Traffic Act 1934, Part II and Part III except so far as it relates to sections forty and forty-two of the Public Health Acts Amendment Act 1890, and section fourteen of the Public Health Act 1925. The Fourth and Fifth Schedules.
9 & 10 Geo. 6. c. 30	Trunk Roads Act 1946	Trunk Roads Act, 1946.	Sections one and two. In section three, subsection (2). Sections five to ten. In section eleven, in subsection (1), the definitions of "the Act of 1935" and "swing bridge", and subsection (2). In section twelve, subsection (3). Sections thirteen and sixteen. The First and Second Schedules. The Third Schedule in so far as it amends any enactment repealed by this Act. The Fourth Schedule in so far as it relates to section five of, and the Fourth Schedule to, the Trunk Roads Act 1936.
9 & 10 Geo. 6. c. 49	Acquisition of Land (Authorisation Procedure) Act 1946	Acquisition of Land (Authorisation Procedure) Act, 1946.	In section one, in paragraph (b) of subsection (1), the words from "under section eleven" to "1946, or". The Fourth Schedule in so far as it amends any enactment repealed by this Act.
9 & 10 Geo. 6. c. 68	New Towns Act 1946	New Towns Act, 1946.	In section seven, subsection (2).
10 & 11 Geo. 6. c. 51	Town and Country Planning Act 1947	Town and Country Planning Act, 1947.	In section forty-seven, subsection (1). Section forty-eight.
11 & 12 Geo. 6. c. 26	Local Government Act 1948	Local Government Act, 1948.	Section one hundred and twenty-seven.
12, 13 & 14 Geo. 6. c. 32	Special Roads Act 1949	Special Roads Act, 1949.	Sections one to eight. In section nine, subsections (1), (3) and (5). Sections ten and eleven. Sections thirteen to fifteen. In section sixteen, in subsection (1), the words "Subject to the provisions of the First Schedule to this Act" and the words from "for prescribing" where first occurring to "therewith) and", and subsections (2) and (3). Section seventeen. In section eighteen, in subsection (1), the words "to make or confirm schemes or" and the words "or orders under section two thereof", and subsection (2). In section nineteen, paragraph (b) of subsection (2). Section twenty. In section twenty-one, subsection (1), except so far as it defines "Minister", "special road" and "use". Section twenty-two except subsection (2). The Schedules.
12, 13 & 14 Geo. 6. c. 97	National Parks and Access to the Countryside Act 1949	National Parks and Access to the Countryside Act, 1949.	Sections thirty-nine to fifty, fifty-six and fifty-eight. In section ninety-nine, subsection (4). In section one hundred and one, in subsection (6), the words from "public" to "order or". In section one hundred and seven, in subsection (1), the words "under section forty-six thereof". In section one hundred and eight, paragraph (6) of subsection (1). Part I of the First Schedule so far as it relates to a public path order, a diversion order or an extinguishment order.
14 Geo. 6. c. 24	Highways (Provision of Cattle-Grids) Act 1950	Highways (Provision of Cattle-Grids) Act, 1950.	The whole act except section six and subsections (1) and (4) of section nineteen.
14 Geo. 6. c. 39	Public Utilities Street Works Act 1950	Public Utilities Street Works Act, 1950.	In section twenty-three, subsection (6). In section twenty-seven, subsections (2) and (3). Section twenty-eight. The Fifth Schedule so far as it amends section twenty of the Special Roads Act 1949.
14 & 15 Geo. 6. c. 40	New Streets Act 1951	New Streets Act, 1951.	The whole act.
15 & 16 Geo. 6 & 1 Eliz. 2. c. 48	Costs in Criminal Cases Act 1952	Costs in Criminal Cases Act, 1952.	In section sixteen, in subsection (3), the words "non-repair or".
1 & 2 Eliz. 2. c. 26	Local Government (Miscellaneous Provisions) Act 1953	Local Government (Miscellaneous Provisions) Act, 1953.	Section nine. The First Schedule so far as it amends subsection (1) of section fifty-seven of the Road Traffic Act 1930.
4 & 5 Eliz. 2. c. 6	Miscellaneous Financial Provisions Act 1955	Miscellaneous Financial Provisions Act, 1955.	In section one, subsection (6).
4 & 5 Eliz. 2. c. 20	Agriculture (Improvement of Roads) Act 1955	Agriculture (Improvement of Roads) Act, 1955.	Section forty-five.
4 & 5 Eliz. 2. c. 67	Road Traffic Act 1956	Road Traffic Act, 1956.	In the Eighth Schedule, paragraph 5.
5 & 6 Eliz. 2. c. 33	New Streets Act 1951 (Amendment) Act 1957	New Streets Act 1951 (Amendment) Act, 1957.	The whole act.
5 & 6 Eliz. 2. c. 42	Parish Councils Act 1957	Parish Councils Act, 1957.	In section three, subsection (9).
5 & 6 Eliz. 2. c. 56	Housing Act 1957	Housing Act, 1957.	In section one hundred and forty-seven, subsection (2).

== Subsequent developments ==
The Law Commission proposed the consideration of consolidating the act in their second programme on consolidation and statute law revision, published on 20 April 1971.

Sections 311 and 312(4) of, and schedules 23 and 25 to, the act, together with parts of schedule 22, were repealed by section 1 of, and part XI of the schedule to, the Statute Law (Repeals) Act 1974, which came into force on 27 June 1974.

The whole act was repealed by section 343(3) of, and schedule 25 to, the Highways Act 1980, which came into force on 1 January 1981.
