= Religion Act 1580 =

Act of the Parliament of England

- Act of Parliament
- Parliament of England
- Long title: An Act to retain the Queen's Majesty's Subjects in their due Obedience.
- Citation: 23 Eliz. 1. c. 1
- Territorial extent: England and Wales; Isle of Man

Dates
- Royal assent: 18 March 1581
- Commencement: 16 January 1581 (Note: Start of session.)
- Repealed: England and Wales: 9 August 1844; Isle of Man: 25 July 1991

Other legislation
- Repealed by: England and Wales: Roman Catholics Act 1844; Isle of Man: Statute Law Revision (Isle of Man) Act 1991
- Relates to: Religion Act 1586; Popish Recusants Act 1605; Roman Catholic Relief Act 1791

Status: Repealed

Text of statute as originally enacted

The Religion Act 1580 or Recusancy Act 1680 (23 Eliz. 1. c. 1) was an act of the Parliament of England during the English Reformation.

The act made it high treason to persuade English subjects to withdraw their allegiance to the Queen, or from the Church of England to Rome, or to promise obedience to a foreign authority.

The act also increased the fine for absenteeism from church to £20 a month or imprisonment until they conformed. Finally, the act fined and imprisoned those who celebrated the mass or attended a mass.

== Subsequent developments ==
The whole act was repealed for England and Wales by section 1 of the Roman Catholics Act 1844 (7 & 8 Vict. c. 102), which came into force on 9 August 1944.

The whole act was repealed for the Isle of Man by section 1(2) of, and schedule 2 to, the Statute Law Revision (Isle of Man) Act 1991, which came into force on 25 July 1991.

== See also ==
- Praemunire
- High treason in the United Kingdom

== Bibliography ==
- Tomlins, Thomas Edlyne; Raithby, John (1811). Religion Act 1587 [29 Eliz. I. - A.D. 1587 Chapter VI]. The Statutes at Large, of England and of Great Britain: from Magna Carta to the Union of the Kingdoms of Great Britain and Ireland. Vol. IV. London, Great Britain: George Eyre and Andrew Strahan. pp. 442–445. OCLC 15609908 – via Internet Archive.
- Tomlins, Thomas Edlyne; Raithby, John (1811). An Act for the better discovering and repressing of Popish Recusants (1605) [3 Jac. I. - A.D. 1605 Chapter IV]. The Statutes at Large, of England and of Great Britain: from Magna Carta to the Union of the Kingdoms of Great Britain and Ireland. Vol. IV. London, Great Britain: George Eyre and Andrew Strahan. pp. 637–649. OCLC 15609908 – via Internet Archive.
- Frederick, George William (1794). Religion Act 1791 [31 Geo. III. - A.D. 1791 Chapter XXXII]. The Statutes at Large, from the Thirtieth Year to Thirty-fourth Year of Reign of King George the Third. Vol. XVI. London, Great Britain: Charles Eyre and Andrew Strahan. pp. 129–134. OCLC 722388097.
