= Bridges Act 1530 =

Act of the Parliament of England

Bridges Act 1530 (Note: The citation of this Act by this short title was authorised by section 5 of, and the second schedule to, the Statute Law Revision Act 1948. Due to the repeal of those provisions, it is now authorised by section 19(2) of the Interpretation Act 1978.)
- Act of Parliament
- Parliament of England
- Long title: An Acte concernyng the amendement of Bridges in Highe Wayes. (Note: These words are printed against this act in the second column of the second schedule to the Statute Law Revision Act 1948, which is headed "Title".)
- Citation: 22 Hen. 8. c. 5
- Territorial extent: England and Wales

Dates
- Royal assent: 31 March 1531
- Commencement: 16 January 1531 (Note: Start of session.)
- Repealed: 1 April 1965
Other legislation
Amended by	Statute Law Revision Act 1888; Local Government Act 1933; Highways Act 1959
Repealed by	London Government Act 1963
Relates to	Cardiff Bridge Act 1580; Bridges Act 1702; Bridges Act 1803

Status: Repealed

Text of statute as originally enacted

The Bridges Act 1530 (22 Hen. 8. c. 5), sometimes called the Statute of Bridges, was an act of the Parliament of England passed in 1531 to ensure the upkeep of bridges, which at the time were usually made of wood and required regular maintenance in order to keep them open.

Section 3 of the act ceased to have effect by virtue of section 311 of, and schedule 23 to, the Highways Act 1959 (7 & 8 Eliz. 2. c. 25). The whole act was repealed by section 312(2) of, and Schedule 25 to, the Highways Act 1959 (except as it related to non-trunk roads in Greater London). The repeal effected by section 312(2) of the Highways Act 1959 was extended to Greater London by section 16(2) of, and paragraph 70 of schedule 6 to, the London Government Act 1963.

== Section 1 ==
In this section, the words "whereof one to be of the quorum" were repealed by section 1 of, and schedule 1 to, the Statute Law Revision Act 1948 (11 & 12 Geo. 6. c. 62).

Section I of the act empowered justices of the peace to look into matters of broken bridges and to arrange for their repair or rebuilding by, or at the expense of, those who were responsible for their maintenance.

== Section 2 ==
Under section II, in cases where those responsible could not be determined, the burden would fall on the inhabitants of the city or town the bridge was situated in; if it lay outside a town, then the burden would fall on the shire or riding as a whole.

== Section 3 ==
In this section, the words "or iiii of the said justices at the leaste whereof one to be of the quorum", the words from "to call before them the constables" to "inhabitauntes shall have power and auctoritie", and the words from "and after such taxacion made" to "delyver to the owner thereof" were repealed by section 1 of, and schedule 1 to, the Statute Law Revision Act 1948 (11 & 12 Geo. 6. c. 62).

Section III of the act provided that in these cases, the justices of the peace were empowered to call before them the constables of every town and parish in the area responsible – in the absence of the constables, "two of the most honest inhabitants" would suffice – and, with their assent, assess and then tax every inhabitant for a reasonable sum to cover the cost of the work required. The justices were to draw up a roll of all persons so taxed, and appoint two collectors in every hundred. The justices were also given the power to appoint two surveyors to oversee the work, who would receive the money from the collectors.

== Section 7 ==
In this section, the words "whereof one to be of the quorum" were repealed by section 1 of, and the first schedule to, the Statute Law Revision Act 1948 (11 & 12 Geo. 6. c. 62), which came into force on 30 July 1948.

=== Bridges Act 1803 ===
Bridges Act 1803 (Note: The citation of this act by this short title was authorised by section 1 of, and the first schedule to, the Short Titles Act 1896. Due to the repeal of those provisions it is now authorised by section 19(2) of the Interpretation Act 1978.)
- Act of Parliament
- Parliament of the United Kingdom
- Long title: An Act for remedying certain Defects in the Laws relative to the building and repairing of County Bridges, and other Works maintained at the Expense of the Inhabitants of Counties in England.
- Citation: 43 Geo. 3. c. 59
- Territorial extent: England and Wales (Note: Preamble)

Dates
- Royal assent: 24 June 1803
- Commencement: 24 June 1803 (Note: The Acts of Parliament (Commencement) Act 1793.)
- Repealed: 1 April 1965
Other legislation
Amends	Bridges Act 1530
Amended by	Bridges Act 1814; Criminal Law Act 1826; Statute Law Revision Act 1888; Statute Law Revision Act 1890; Local Government Act 1933
Repealed by	Highways Act 1959; London Government Act 1963
Relates to	Plymouth Corporation Act 1923

Status: Repealed

Text of statute as originally enacted

The Bridges Act 1803 (43 Geo. 3. c. 59) created some additional statutory provisions that had become necessary due to the effluence of time and events since the 1530 act. This included giving statutory weight to the common law title of the key technical officials engaged for these functions by the Crown, namely, the county surveyor of the county responsible for the upkeep of subject bridges, and the roads over them for 100 yards past the ends of the bridge.

== See also ==
- Bridges Act
