= Bridges Act 1702 =

Act of the Parliament of England

Bridges Act 1702 (Note: The citation of this act by this short title was authorised by section 5 of, and the second schedule to, the Statute Law Revision Act 1948. Due to the repeal of those provisions, it is now authorised by section 19(2) of the Interpretation Act 1978.)
- Act of Parliament
- Parliament of England
- Long title: An Act to explain and alter the Act made in the two and twentieth year of King Henry the Eighth concerning the repairing and amending of Bridges in the Highways and for repealing an Act made in the Twenty third year of Queen Elizabeth for the re-edifying of Cardiffe Bridge in the County of Glamorgan and also for changing the day of Election of the Wardens and Assistants of Rochester Bridge. (Note: These words are printed against this act in the second column of the second schedule to the Statute Law Revision Act 1948, which is headed "Title".)
- Citation: 1 Ann. c. 12 (Note: This is the citation in The Statutes of the Realm.); 1 Ann. St. 1. c. 18 (Note: This is the citation in The Statutes at Large.)
- Territorial extent: England and Wales

Dates
- Royal assent: 6 May 1702
- Commencement: 1 May 1702 (Note: Section 1.)
- Repealed: 1 April 1965
Other legislation
Amends	Bridges Act 1530
Repeals/revokes	Cardiff Bridge Act 1580
Amended by	Statute Law Revision Act 1867; Statute Law Revision Act 1888; Public Authorities Protection Act 1893; Rochester Bridge Act 1908; Administration of Justice (Miscellaneous Provisions) Act 1938; Highways Act 1959
Repealed by	Highways Act 1959; London Government Act 1963
Relates to	Bridges Act 1530; Cardiff Bridge Act 1580

Status: Repealed

Text of statute as originally enacted

The Bridges Act 1702 (1 Ann. c. 12) was an act of the Parliament of England.

== Subsequent developments ==
Section 7 of the act was repealed by section 2 of, and the schedule to, the Public Authorities Protection Act 1893 (56 & 57 Vict. c. 61), which came into force on 1 January 1894.

Section 5 of the act was repealed by section 20(3) of, and the fourth schedule to, the Administration of Justice (Miscellaneous Provisions) Act 1938 (1 & 2 Geo. 6. c. 63), which came into force on 1 January 1939.

Section 2 ceased to have effect by virtue of section 311 of, and schedule 23 to, the Highways Act 1959 (7 & 8 Eliz. 2. c. 25).

The whole act was repealed by section 312(2) of, and schedule 25 to, the Highways Act 1959 (7 & 8 Eliz. 2. c. 25), subject to section 42(1) of that act, which came into force on 1 January 1960.

The repeal effected by section 312(2) of the Highways Act 1959 (7 & 8 Eliz. 2. c. 25) was extended to the whole of Greater London by section 16(2) of, and paragraph 70 of schedule 6 to, the London Government Act 1963, which came into force on 1 April 1965.

== See also ==
- Bridges Act
