= Cardiff Bridge =

Grade II listed building in Cardiff

Coordinates: 51.4810°N 3.1858°W

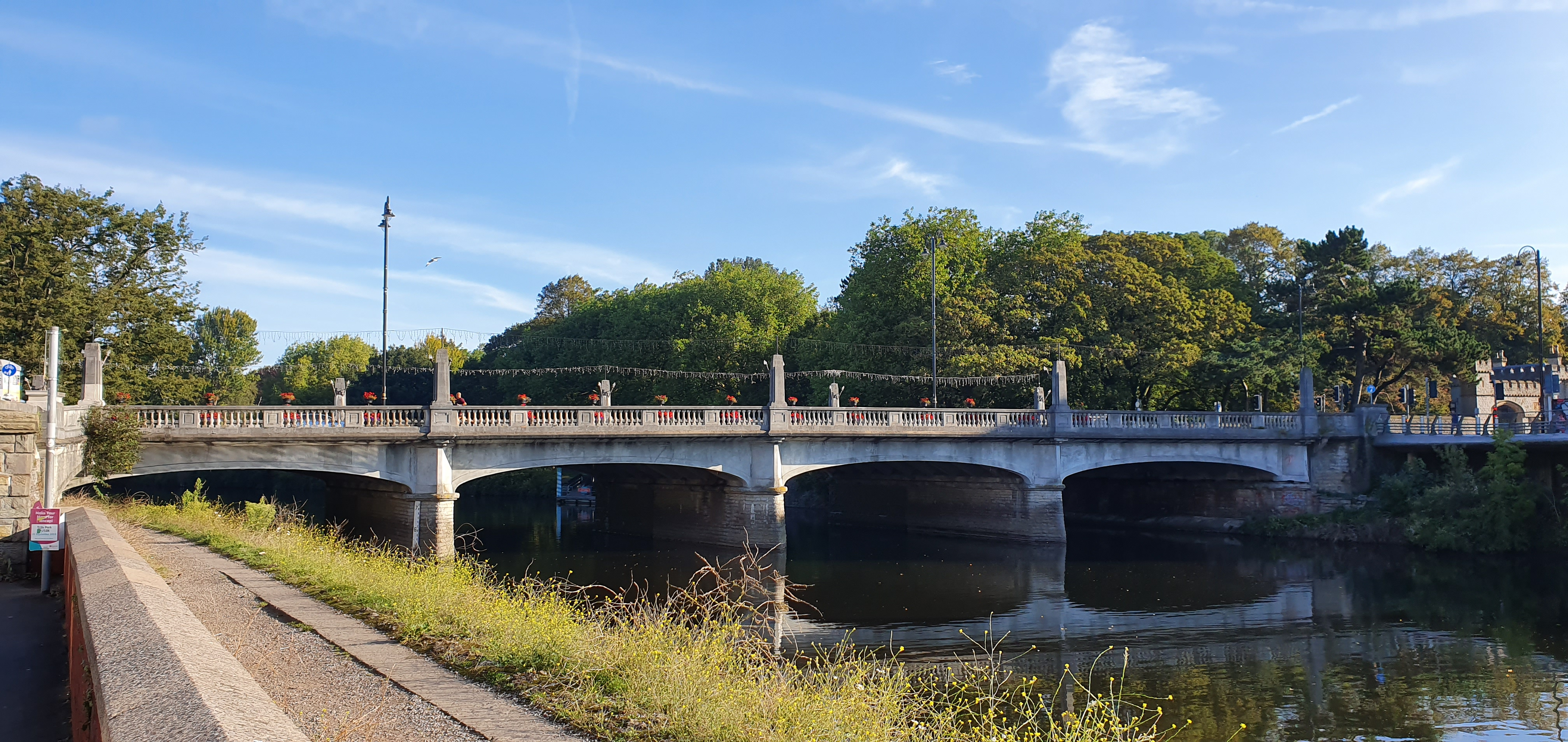
Cardiff Bridge

Cardiff Bridge (also known locally as Canton Bridge) is the road bridge crossing the River Taff at the approximate site of the original river crossing, close to Cardiff Castle in the centre of Cardiff, Wales.

== Early history ==
Cardiff Bridge Act 1580
- Act of Parliament
- Parliament of England
- Long title: An act for the re-edifying of Cardiff-bridge, in the county of Glamorgan.
- Citation: 23 Eliz. 1. c. 11
- Territorial extent: England and Wales

Dates
- Royal assent: 18 March 1581
- Commencement: 16 January 1581 (Note: Start of session.)
- Repealed: 1 May 1702
Other legislation
Repealed by	Bridges Act 1702
Relates to	Bridges Act 1530

Status: Repealed

Text of statute as originally enacted

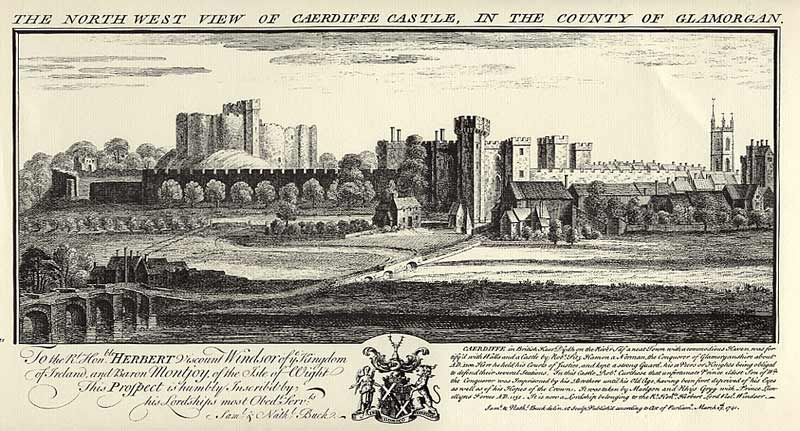
18th-century view of Cardiff with Cardiff Bridge in the left foreground

A bridge link crossing the Taff at Cardiff has existed since Roman times, though a safer river crossing beyond the tidal range was preferred at Llandaff, to the north. In 1582 the timber bridge was replaced by one built of stone, to the north of the current bridge and connecting to the town's Westgate. It was continually damaged by flooding and rebuilt in 1649, 1671 and 1720. When the Westgate was demolished in 1781 it was decided to relocate and rebuild the bridge. A narrow replacement was completed in 1796 (footpaths were later added supported by corbels). In 1827 another huge flood swept away the bridge and traffic reverted to using the crossing at Llandaff.

In 1859 a new stone bridge was built, incorporating parts of the earlier structure and with iron lattice railings. It was widened in 1877.

== 20th century ==
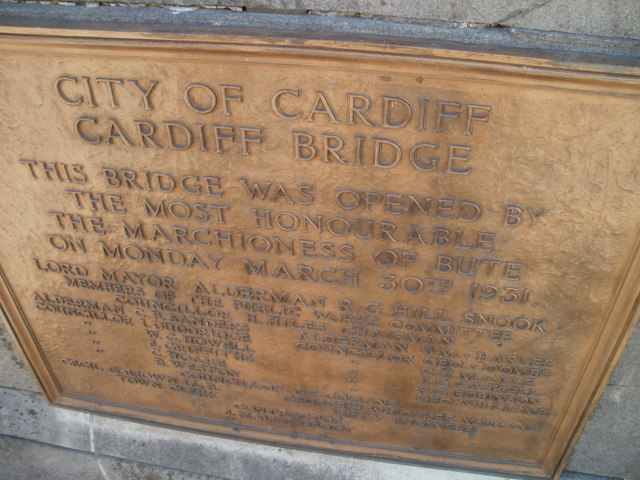
Cardiff Bridge plaque

In 1930/1 the bridge was almost completely replaced with the currently existing bridge. This has broad arches made from reinforced concrete supported on stone pillars with a rusticated finish. Above each pier was a cenotaph-style obelisk holding a bronze torch.

The bridge was Grade II listed in 2002, being a good and original pre-World War II reinforced concrete bridge.

== 21st century ==
In 2014 segregated cycle paths in each direction were constructed, separating cyclists from pedestrians and motor vehicles.

The bridge was Grade II listed in 2002, being a good and original pre-World War II reinforced concrete bridge.

== See also ==
- List of bridges in Wales
