= List of acts of the Parliament of the United Kingdom from 1813 =

This is a complete list of acts of the Parliament of the United Kingdom for the year 1813.

Note that the first parliament of the United Kingdom was held in 1801; parliaments between 1707 and 1800 were either parliaments of Great Britain or of Ireland). For acts passed up until 1707, see the list of acts of the Parliament of England and the list of acts of the Parliament of Scotland. For acts passed from 1707 to 1800, see the list of acts of the Parliament of Great Britain. See also the list of acts of the Parliament of Ireland.

For acts of the devolved parliaments and assemblies in the United Kingdom, see the list of acts of the Scottish Parliament, the list of acts of the Northern Ireland Assembly, and the list of acts and measures of Senedd Cymru; see also the list of acts of the Parliament of Northern Ireland.

The number shown after each act's title is its chapter number. Acts passed before 1963 are cited using this number, preceded by the year(s) of the reign during which the relevant parliamentary session was held; thus the Union with Ireland Act 1800 is cited as "39 & 40 Geo. 3 c. 67", meaning the 67th act passed during the session that started in the 39th year of the reign of George III and which finished in the 40th year of that reign. Note that the modern convention is to use Arabic numerals in citations (thus "41 Geo. 3" rather than "41 Geo. III"). Acts of the last session of the Parliament of Great Britain and the first session of the Parliament of the United Kingdom are both cited as "41 Geo. 3". Acts passed from 1963 onwards are simply cited by calendar year and chapter number.

All modern acts have a short title, e.g. "the Local Government Act 2003". Some earlier acts also have a short title given to them by later acts, such as by the Short Titles Act 1896.

== 53 Geo. 3 ==
Continuing the first session of the 5th Parliament of the United Kingdom, which met from 24 November 1812 until 22 July 1813.

This session was also traditionally cited as 53 G. 3.

=== Public general acts ===
Short title	Citation	Royal assent
Long title
Mutiny Act 1813 (repealed)	53 Geo. 3. c. 17	23 March 1813
An Act for punishing Mutiny and Desertion; and for the better Payment of the Army and their Quarters. (Repealed by Statute Law Revision Act 1873 (36 & 37 Vict. c. 91))
Drawback on Coals Act 1813 (repealed)	53 Geo. 3. c. 18	23 March 1813
An Act for allowing a Drawback of the Duty on Coals used in Fire or Steam Engines for raising Ores in the Counties of Devon and Cornwall. (Repealed by Drawbacks on Coals, etc. Act 1821 (1 & 2 Geo. 4. c. 67))
Issue, etc., of Gold and Silver Tokens Act 1813 (repealed)	53 Geo. 3. c. 19	23 March 1813
An Act to amend an Act of the last Session of Parliament, (Note: Tokens Act 1812 (52 Geo. 3. c. 157)) to prevent the issuing and circulating of Pieces of Gold and Silver or other Metal usually called Tokens, except such as are issued by the Banks of England and Ireland respectively. (Repealed by Statute Law Revision Act 1861 (24 & 25 Vict. c. 101))
Militia (Great Britain) Act 1813 (repealed)	53 Geo. 3. c. 20	23 March 1813
An Act to allow a limited Proportion of the Corps of Miners to inlist into the Regular Forces. (Repealed by Statute Law Revision Act 1861 (24 & 25 Vict. c. 101))
Prisoners for Certain Debts, etc. Act 1813 (repealed)	53 Geo. 3. c. 21	23 March 1813
An Act for authorizing the Commissioners of Customs and Excise to make an Allowance for the necessary Subsistence of poor Persons confined for Debts or Penalties sued for under their Orders. (Repealed by Statute Law Revision Act 1861 (24 & 25 Vict. c. 101))
Salt Duties Act 1813 (repealed)	53 Geo. 3. c. 22	23 March 1813
An Act for empowering the Commissioners of Excise to sell Salt seized Duty free, either for Exportation or for curing Fish, and to reward the seizing Officer. (Repealed by Statute Law Revision Act 1861 (24 & 25 Vict. c. 101))
Making of Starch Act 1813 (repealed)	53 Geo. 3. c. 23	23 March 1813
An Act to repeal so much of an Act of this Session (Note: Importation, etc. (No. 2) Act 1812 (53 Geo. 3. c. 2)) as continues the Prohibition of the making of Starch from Wheat and other Articles of Food. (Repealed by Statute Law Revision Act 1873 (36 & 37 Vict. c. 91))
Administration of Justice Act 1813 or the Vice-Chancellor of England Act 1813 (repealed)	53 Geo. 3. c. 24	23 March 1813
An Act to facilitate the Administration of Justice. (Repealed by Civil Procedure Acts Repeal Act 1879 (42 & 43 Vict. c. 59))
Marine Mutiny Act 1813 (repealed)	53 Geo. 3. c. 25	23 March 1813
An Act for the regulating of His Majesty's Royal Marine Forces while on Shore. (Repealed by Statute Law Revision Act 1873 (36 & 37 Vict. c. 91))
Exchequer Bills Act 1813 (repealed)	53 Geo. 3. c. 26	1 April 1813
An Act for raising the Sum of Five Millions, by Exchequer Bills, for the Service of Great Britain, for the Year One thousand eight hundred and thirteen. (Repealed by Statute Law Revision Act 1873 (36 & 37 Vict. c. 91))
Exchequer Bills (No. 2) Act 1813 (repealed)	53 Geo. 3. c. 27	1 April 1813
An Act for raising the Sum of One million five hundred thousand Pounds, by Exchequer Bills, for the Service of Great Britain, for the Year One thousand eight hundred and thirteen. (Repealed by Statute Law Revision Act 1873 (36 & 37 Vict. c. 91))
Local Militia (England) Act 1813 (repealed)	53 Geo. 3. c. 28	1 April 1813
An Act to explain and amend an Act, passed in the last Session of Parliament, (Note: Local Militia (England) Act 1812 (52 Geo. 3. c. 38)) for amending the Laws relating to the Local Militia in England. (Repealed by Territorial Army and Militia Act 1921 (11 & 12 Geo. 5. c. 37))
Militia (Scotland) Act 1813 (repealed)	53 Geo. 3. c. 29	1 April 1813
An Act to explain and amend an Act passed in the last Session of Parliament, intituled "An Act for amending the Laws relating to the Local Militia in Scotland." (Note: Local Militia (Scotland) Act 1812 (52 Geo. 3. c. 68)) (Repealed by Territorial Army and Militia Act 1921 (11 & 12 Geo. 5. c. 37))
Exportation Act 1813 (repealed)	53 Geo. 3. c. 30	1 April 1813
An Act to allow a Bounty on the Exportation of the Manufactures of Refuse or Waste Silk. (Repealed by Statute Law Revision Act 1861 (24 & 25 Vict. c. 101))
Exportation (No. 2) Act 1813 (repealed)	53 Geo. 3. c. 31	1 April 1813
An Act for further continuing, until the Twenty fifth Day of March One thousand eight hundred and fourteen, certain Bounties and Drawbacks on the Exportation of Sugar from Great Britain; and for suspending the Countervailing Duties and Bounties on Sugar, when the Duties imposed by an Act of the Forty ninth Year of His present Majesty (Note: Customs (No. 3) Act 1809 (49 Geo. 3. c. 98)) shall be suspended. (Repealed by Statute Law Revision Act 1873 (36 & 37 Vict. c. 91))
Exportation (No. 3) Act 1813 (repealed)	53 Geo. 3. c. 32	1 April 1813
An Act to continue, until the Twenty fifth Day of March One thousand eight hundred and fourteen, an Act (Note: Drawbacks (Ireland) Act 1807 (47 Geo. 3 Sess. 1. c. 19)) for regulating the Drawbacks and Bounties on the Exportation of Sugar from Ireland. (Repealed by Statute Law Revision Act 1873 (36 & 37 Vict. c. 91))
Customs Act 1813 (repealed)	53 Geo. 3. c. 33	15 April 1813
An Act for granting certain additional Duties of Customs imported into, and exported from Great Britain. (Repealed by Statute Law Revision Act 1861 (24 & 25 Vict. c. 101))
Importation Act 1813 (repealed)	53 Geo. 3. c. 34	15 April 1813
An Act for granting to His Majesty additional Duties of Excise in Great Britain, on Tobacco and Snuff, and on French Wines. (Repealed by Statute Law Revision Act 1861 (24 & 25 Vict. c. 101))
National Debt Act 1813 (repealed)	53 Geo. 3. c. 35	15 April 1813
An Act to alter and amend several Acts passed in His present Majesty's Reign, relating to the Redemption of the National Debt; and for making further Provisions in respect thereof. (Repealed by Statute Law Revision Act 1873 (36 & 37 Vict. c. 91))
Passenger Vessels Act 1813 (repealed)	53 Geo. 3. c. 36	15 April 1813
An Act to amend an Act, passed in the Forty third Year of His present Majesty, (Note: Passenger Vessels Act 1803 (43 Geo. 3. c. 56)) for regulating the Vessels carrying Passengers to His Majesty's Plantations and Settlements Abroad. (Repealed by Passenger Vessels Act 1823 (4 Geo. 4. c. 84))
Importation (No. 2) Act 1813 (repealed)	53 Geo. 3. c. 37	15 April 1813
An Act to amend an Act of the Twenty eighth Year of His present Majesty, (Note: Importation Act 1788 (28 Geo. 3. c. 39)) for allowing the Importation of Rum or other Spirits from His Majesty's Colonies or Plantations in the West Indies, into the Province of Quebec without Payment of Duty. (Repealed by Trade Act 1822 (3 Geo. 4. c. 44))
Exportation (No. 4) Act 1813 (repealed)	53 Geo. 3. c. 38	15 April 1813
An Act for regulating the Exportation of Corn and other Articles to Newfoundland, Nova Scotia, the Bay of Chaleur, and the Coast of Labrador. (Repealed by Statute Law Revision Act 1861 (24 & 25 Vict. c. 101))
Transportation Act 1813 (repealed)	53 Geo. 3. c. 39	15 April 1813
An Act to continue, until the Twenty fifth Day of March One thousand eight hundred and fourteen, several Laws relating to the Transportation of Felons and other Offenders to temporary Places of Confinement in England and Scotland. (Repealed by Statute Law Revision Act 1873 (36 & 37 Vict. c. 91))
Wages, etc., of Artificers, etc. Act 1813 (repealed)	53 Geo. 3. c. 40	15 April 1813
An Act to repeal so much of several Acts passed in England and Scotland respectively, as empowers Justices of the Peace to rate Wages, or set Prices of Work, for Artificers, Labourers or Craftsmen. (Repealed by Statute Law Revision Act 1873 (36 & 37 Vict. c. 91))
National Debt (No. 2) Act 1813 (repealed)	53 Geo. 3. c. 41	1 May 1813
An Act for granting Annuities to satisfy certain Exchequer Bills; and for raising a Sum of Money by Debentures for the Service of Great Britain. (Repealed by Statute Law Revision Act 1870 (33 & 34 Vict. c. 69))
Exchequer Bills (No. 3) Act 1813 (repealed)	53 Geo. 3. c. 42	1 May 1813
An Act to enable the Commissioners of His Majesty's Treasury to issue Exchequer Bills, on the Credit of such Aids or Supplies as have been or shall be granted by Parliament for the Service of Great Britain for the Year One thousand eight hundred and thirteen. (Repealed by Statute Law Revision Act 1873 (36 & 37 Vict. c. 91))
Quartering of Soldiers Act 1813 (repealed)	53 Geo. 3. c. 43	1 May 1813
An Act for increasing the Rates of Subsistence to be paid to Innkeepers and others on quartering Soldiers. (Repealed by Statute Law Revision Act 1873 (36 & 37 Vict. c. 91))
Drawback on Wines Act 1813 (repealed)	53 Geo. 3. c. 44	21 May 1813
An Act for allowing a Drawback of the Duties upon Wines consumed by Officers of the Royal Marines serving on board His Majesty's Ships. (Repealed by Customs Law Repeal Act 1825 (6 Geo. 4. c. 105))
Exportation (No. 5) Act 1813 (repealed)	53 Geo. 3. c. 45	21 May 1813
An Act for repealing Two Acts which prohibit the Exportation of Brass and other Metal from England. (Repealed by Statute Law Revision Act 1873 (36 & 37 Vict. c. 91))
Butter Trade (Ireland) Act 1813 (repealed)	53 Geo. 3. c. 46	21 May 1813
An Act for the further Regulation of the Butter Trade of Ireland. (Repealed by Statute Law Revision Act 1873 (36 & 37 Vict. c. 91))
Customs (No. 2) Act 1813 (repealed)	53 Geo. 3. c. 47	21 May 1813
An Act to empower the Officers of His Majesty's Customs to take Bonds from Persons under Twenty one Years of Age, serving as Mates on board of Merchant Vessels. (Repealed by Customs Law Repeal Act 1825 (6 Geo. 4. c. 105))
Local Militia (Ireland) Act 1813 (repealed)	53 Geo. 3. c. 48	21 May 1813
An Act to amend the Laws for raising and training the Militia of Ireland. (Repealed by Militia (Voluntary Enlistment) Act 1875 (38 & 39 Vict. c. 69), Militia Act 1882 (45 & 46 Vict. c. 49), Territorial Army and Militia Act 1921 (11 & 12 Geo. 5. c. 37) and Statute Law Revision Act 1953 (2 & 3 Eliz. 2. c. 5))
Parliamentary Elections Act 1813 (repealed)	53 Geo. 3. c. 49	21 May 1813
An Act to explain and amend an Act, passed in the Seventh and Eight Years of the Reign of the late King William, (Note: Parliamentary Elections Act 1695 (7 & 8 Will. 3. c. 25)) as far as relates to the splitting and dividing the Interest in Houses and Lands among several Persons to enable them to vote at Elections of Members to serve in Parliament. (Repealed by Representation of the People Act 1918 (7 & 8 Geo. 5. c. 64))
Bermuda Trade Act 1813 (repealed)	53 Geo. 3. c. 50	21 May 1813
An Act for further allowing the Importation and Exportation of certain Articles at the Island of Bermuda. (Repealed by Trade Act 1822 (3 Geo. 4. c. 44))
Officers' Widows' Pensions Act 1813 (repealed)	53 Geo. 3. c. 51	21 May 1813
An Act to relieve the Widows of Military Officers from the Payment of Stamp Duties on the Receipt of their Pensions in Ireland. (Repealed by Pensions and Yeomanry Pay Act 1884 (47 & 48 Vict. c. 55))
Distillation, etc., of Spirits (Ireland) Act 1813 (repealed)	53 Geo. 3. c. 52	21 May 1813
An Act to encourage the Distillation of Spirits from Sugar in Ireland, and to permit the Warehousing of such Spirits without Payment of the Duty of Excise chargeable thereon. (Repealed by Statute Law Revision Act 1861 (24 & 25 Vict. c. 101))
National Debt (No. 3) Act 1813 (repealed)	53 Geo. 3. c. 53	21 May 1813
An Act for raising a further Sum of Money by Debentures for the Service of Great Britain; and for granting Annuities to satisfy certain Exchequer Bills; and for amending an Act of this Session of Parliament (Note: National Debt (No. 2) Act 1813 (53 Geo. 3. c. 41)) for granting Annuities to satisfy certain Exchequer Bills; and for raising a Sum of Money by Debentures. (Repealed by Statute Law Revision Act 1870 (33 & 34 Vict. c. 69))
Battle-axe Guards (Ireland) Act 1813 (repealed)	53 Geo. 3. c. 54	21 May 1813
An Act to amend an Act made in the Forty ninth Year of His Majesty's Reign, intituled "An Act for the further Prevention of the Sale and Brokerage of Offices." (Note: Sale of Offices Act 1809 (49 Geo. 3. c. 126)) (Repealed by Statute Law Revision Act 1873 (36 & 37 Vict. c. 91))
Importation and Exportation Act 1813 (repealed)	53 Geo. 3. c. 55	3 June 1813
An Act to continue until the Fifth Day of July One thousand eight hundred and fourteen, and to amend several Acts for granting certain Rates and Duties, and for allowing certain Drawbacks and Bounties on Goods, Wares and Merchandize imported into and exported from Ireland; and to grant until the said Fifth Day of July One thousand eight hundred and fourteen, certain new and additional Duties on the Importation, and to allow Drawbacks on the Exportation of certain Goods, Wares and Merchandize into and from Ireland. (Repealed by Customs Law Repeal Act 1825 (6 Geo. 4. c. 105))
Excise Act 1813 (repealed)	53 Geo. 3. c. 56	3 June 1813
An Act to grant to His Majesty certain Duties of Excise in Ireland on Malt. (Repealed by Statute Law Revision Act 1861 (24 & 25 Vict. c. 101))
Excise (No. 2) Act 1813 (repealed)	53 Geo. 3. c. 57	3 June 1813
An Act to grant to His Majesty certain Duties of Excise in Ireland on Tobacco. (Repealed by Statute Law Revision Act 1861 (24 & 25 Vict. c. 101))
Postage Act 1813 (repealed)	53 Geo. 3. c. 58	3 June 1813
An Act to repeal certain Rates and Duties upon Letters and Packets sent by the Post from or to Dublin, to or from the several Post Towns in Ireland, and to grant other Rates and Duties in lieu thereof; and to make further Regulations for securing the Duties on Letters and Packets sent by the Post in Ireland. (Repealed by Post Office (Repeal of Laws) Act 1837 (7 Will. 4 & 1 Vict. c. 32))
Duties on Carriages, etc. (Ireland) Act 1813 (repealed)	53 Geo. 3. c. 59	3 June 1813
An Act to grant to His Majesty certain Duties and Taxes in Ireland, in respect of Carriages, Horses, Male Servants, and Windows, in lieu of former Duties and Taxes in respect of the like Articles. (Repealed by Statute Law Revision Act 1861 (24 & 25 Vict. c. 101))
Duties on Hides, etc. (Ireland) Act 1813 (repealed)	53 Geo. 3. c. 60	3 June 1813
An Act for the better Collection of the Duties on Hides and Skins tanned or dressed in Oil, and on Vellum and Parchment made in Ireland; and for preventing Frauds on His Majesty's Revenue therein. (Repealed by Statute Law Revision Act 1861 (24 & 25 Vict. c. 101))
National Debt (No. 4) Act 1813 (repealed)	53 Geo. 3. c. 61	3 June 1813
An Act for raising the Sum of Two Millions by way of Annuities and Treasury Bills for the Service of Ireland. (Repealed by Statute Law Revision Act 1870 (33 & 34 Vict. c. 69))
Duties on Sugar Act 1813 (repealed)	53 Geo. 3. c. 62	3 June 1813
An Act to permit the Entry for Home Consumption of Sugar the Produce or Manufacture of Martinique, Mariegalante, Guaduloupe, Saint Eustatia, Saint Martin and Saba, at a lower Rate of Duty than is payable upon Sugar not of the British Plantations. (Repealed by Statute Law Revision Act 1861 (24 & 25 Vict. c. 101))
American Prizes Act 1813 (repealed)	53 Geo. 3. c. 63	3 June 1813
An Act to extend Two Acts of the Forty fifth (Note: Manning of the Navy Act 1805 (45 Geo. 3. c. 72)) and Forty ninth (Note: Prize Money Act 1809 (49 Geo. 3. c. 123)) Years of His present Majesty to American Prizes. (Repealed by Naval Prize Acts Repeal Act 1864 (27 & 28 Vict. c. 23))
Court of Session Act 1813 (repealed)	53 Geo. 3. c. 64	3 June 1813
An Act for the better Regulation of the Court of Session in Scotland. (Repealed by Court of Session Act 1988 (c. 36))
Payment of Creditors (Scotland) Act 1813 (repealed)	53 Geo. 3. c. 65	3 June 1813
An Act for continuing, until the Twenty fifth Day of July One thousand eight hundred and fourteen, an Act made in the Thirty third Year of His present Majesty, (Note: Payment of Creditors (Scotland) Act 1793 (33 Geo. 3. c. 74)) for rendering the Payment of Creditors more equal and expeditious in Scotland. (Repealed by Statute Law Revision Act 1873 (36 & 37 Vict. c. 91))
Sites of Parish Churches (Ireland) Act 1813	53 Geo. 3. c. 66	3 June 1813
An Act for explaining and clearing up certain Doubts respecting the Scites of Parish Churches within Ireland.
Exportation and Importation Act 1813 (repealed)	53 Geo. 3. c. 67	3 June 1813
An Act for empowering His Majesty to authorize the Importation and Exportation of certain Articles into and from the West Indies, South America and Newfoundland, until Six Weeks after the Commencement of the next Session of Parliament. (Repealed by Statute Law Revision Act 1873 (36 & 37 Vict. c. 91))
Postage, etc. Act 1813 (repealed)	53 Geo. 3. c. 68	3 June 1813
An Act to repeal the Exemption from Toll granted for or in respect of Carriages with more than Two Wheels, carrying the Mail in Scotland; and for granting a Rate for Postage, as an Indemnity for the Loss which may arise to the Revenue of the Post Office from the Payment of such Tolls. (Repealed by Post Office (Repeal of Laws) Act 1837 (7 Will. 4 & 1 Vict. c. 32))
National Debt (No. 5) Act 1813 (repealed)	53 Geo. 3. c. 69	22 June 1813
An Act for raising the Sum of Twenty seven Millions by way of Annuities. (Repealed by Statute Law Revision Act 1870 (33 & 34 Vict. c. 69))
Glass, etc., Duties Act 1813 (repealed)	53 Geo. 3. c. 70	22 June 1813
An Act to authorize the Sellers of Glass, Hides, Tobacco and Snuff, to charge the additional Duties on any such Articles ordered before but not delivered until after the Fifth Day of July One thousand eight hundred and twelve. (Repealed by Statute Law Revision Act 1873 (36 & 37 Vict. c. 91))
Controverted Elections Act 1813 (repealed)	53 Geo. 3. c. 71	22 June 1813
An Act for amending and rendering more effectual the Laws for the Trials of Controverted Elections and Returns of Members to serve in Parliament. (Repealed by Controverted Elections Act 1828 (9 Geo. 4. c. 22))
Manchester Stipendiary Magistrate Act 1813 or the Stipendiary Magistrate, Manchester Act 1813 (repealed)	53 Geo. 3. c. 72	22 June 1813
An Act for the more effectual Administration of the Office of a Justice of the Peace within the Townships of Manchester and Salford, in the Hundred of Salford, in the County Palatine of Lancaster; and to provide by Means of a Rate on the said Townships and otherwise, a competent Salary to a Justice of the Peace acting within the said Townships; and to enable the Constables of Manchester and Salford to take Recognizances in certain cases. (Repealed by Manchester Division Stipendiary Justice Act 1854 (17 & 18 Vict. c. 20))
Duties, etc., on Tobacco (Ireland) Act 1813 (repealed)	53 Geo. 3. c. 73	2 July 1813
An Act to declare that the Duties of Excise and Drawbacks, granted and made payable in Ireland on Tobacco by an Act of this Session, (Note: Excise (No. 2) Act 1813 (53 Geo. 3. c. 57)) are payable according to the Amount thereof in British Currency. (Repealed by Statute Law Revision Act 1873 (36 & 37 Vict. c. 91))
Duty on Malt (Ireland) Act 1813 (repealed)	53 Geo. 3. c. 74	2 July 1813
An Act to provide for the better Collection of the Duty on Malt made in Ireland. (Repealed by Statute Law Revision Act 1873 (36 & 37 Vict. c. 91))
Cotton Trade (Ireland) Act 1813 (repealed)	53 Geo. 3. c. 75	2 July 1813
An Act for the better Regulation of the Cotton Trade in Ireland. (Repealed by Masters and Workmen Arbitration Act 1824 (5 Geo. 4. c. 96))
Highways (Ireland) Act 1813 (repealed)	53 Geo. 3. c. 76	2 July 1813
An Act to extend the Provisions of an Act, passed in the Forty ninth Year of His present Majesty, (Note: Highways (Ireland) Act 1809 (49 Geo. 3. c. 84)) for amending the Irish Road Acts, so far as the same relate to the Appointment of Supervisors on Mail Coach Roads, to all Roads made and repaired by Presentment. (Repealed by Statute Law Revision Act 1873 (36 & 37 Vict. c. 91))
Bridges (Ireland) Act 1813	53 Geo. 3. c. 77	2 July 1813
An Act to amend an Act, passed in Ireland in the Nineteenth and Twentieth Years of His present Majesty, (Note: Bridges Act 1779 (19 & 20 Geo. 3. c. 41 (I))) for empowering Grand Juries to present Bridges, and Tolls to be paid for passing the same, in certain cases.
Arms (Ireland) Act 1813 (repealed)	53 Geo. 3. c. 78	2 July 1813
An Act to continue for Two Years, and from thence until the End of the then next Session of Parliament, Two Acts made in the Forty seventh (Note: Possession of Arms (Ireland) Act 1807 (47 Geo. 3 Sess. 2. c. 54)) and Fiftieth (Note: Arms (Ireland) Act 1810 (50 Geo. 3. c. 109)) Years of His present Majesty's Reign, for the preventing improper Persons from having Arms in Ireland. (Repealed by Statute Law Revision Act 1873 (36 & 37 Vict. c. 91))
Militia Pay (Ireland) Act 1813 (repealed)	53 Geo. 3. c. 79	2 July 1813
An Act for defraying the Charge of the Pay and Clothing of the Militia of Ireland; and for making Allowances in certain cases to Subaltern Officers of the said Militia during Peace. (Repealed by Statute Law Revision Act 1873 (36 & 37 Vict. c. 91))
Treasury Bills (Ireland) Act 1813 (repealed)	53 Geo. 3. c. 80	2 July 1813
An Act for raising the Sum of Three hundred and thirty thousand Pounds by Treasury Bills for the Service of Ireland, for the Year One thousand eight hundred and thirteen. (Repealed by Statute Law Revision Act 1873 (36 & 37 Vict. c. 91))
Militia Act 1813 (repealed)	53 Geo. 3. c. 81	2 July 1813
An Act to amend several Acts relating to the Militia, and to enlisting of the Militia into His Majesty's Regular Forces. (Repealed by Militia (Voluntary Enlistment) Act 1875 (38 & 39 Vict. c. 69))
Tolls for Certain Carriages Act 1813 (repealed)	53 Geo. 3. c. 82	2 July 1813
An Act to amend an Act made in the Fifty second Year of His present Majesty's Reign, intituled "An Act to explain the Exemption from Toll in several Acts of Parliament, for Carriages employed in Husbandry; and for regulating the Tolls to be paid on other Carriages, and on Horses, in certain other cases therein specified;" (Note: Exemption from Toll Act 1812 (52 Geo. 3. c. 145)) and for other Purposes relating thereto. (Repealed by Turnpike Roads Act 1822 (3 Geo. 4. c. 126))
Diet of Soldiers on a March Act 1813 (repealed)	53 Geo. 3. c. 83	2 July 1813
An Act to increase the Allowance to Innkeepers for Diet furnished to Soldiers on a March. (Repealed by Statute Law Revision Act 1873 (36 & 37 Vict. c. 91))
Duties on Cape Wines Act 1813 (repealed)	53 Geo. 3. c. 84	2 July 1813
An Act for repealing the Duties payable on the Importation of Wine the Produce of the Cape of Good Hope, and its Dependencies, and charging other Duties in lieu thereof. (Repealed by Statute Law Revision Act 1861 (24 & 25 Vict. c. 101))
Maintenance of Seamen in Foreign Parts Act 1813 (repealed)	53 Geo. 3. c. 85	2 July 1813
An Act for amending Two Acts passed in the Thirty first (Note: Navy Act 1757 (31 Geo. 2. c. 10)) and Thirty second (Note: Navy Act 1792 (32 Geo. 3. c. 33)) Years of His present Majesty, for the Encouragement of Seamen employed in the Royal Navy, and for establishing a regular Method for the punctual, frequent and certain Payment of their Wages, and for enabling them more easily and readily to remit the same for the Support of their Wives and Families, and for preventing Frauds and Abuses attending such Payments. (Repealed by Pay of the Navy Act 1830 (11 Geo. 4 & 1 Will. 4. c. 20))
Naval Compensations, etc. Act 1813 (repealed)	53 Geo. 3. c. 86	2 July 1813
An Act to explain an Act made in the Fiftieth Year of His present Majesty, (Note: Public Salaries, etc. Act 1810 (50 Geo. 3. c. 117)) for directing Accounts of Increase end Diminution of Public Salaries, Pensions and Allowances, to be annually laid before Parliament; and to regulate and controul the granting and paying of such Salaries, Pensions and Allowances. (Repealed by Statute Law Revision Act 1861 (24 & 25 Vict. c. 101))
Frauds by Boatmen, etc. Act 1813 (repealed)	53 Geo. 3. c. 87	2 July 1813
An Act to continue for Seven Years Two Acts passed in the Forty eighth (Note: Frauds by Boatmen in Cinque Ports, etc. Act 1808 (48 Geo. 3. c. 130)) and Forty ninth (Note: Frauds by Boatmen and others, etc. Act 1809 (49 Geo. 3. c. 122)) Years of the Reign of His present Majesty, for preventing Frauds by Boatmen and others; and adjusting Salvage; and for extending and amending the Laws relating to Wreck and Salvage. (Repealed by Statute Law Revision Act 1861 (24 & 25 Vict. c. 101))
Excise (No. 3) Act 1813 (repealed)	53 Geo. 3. c. 88	2 July 1813
An Act to substitute a Declaration in lieu of an Oath in the Verification of the Books of Persons dealing in certain Exciseable Articles. (Repealed by Statute Law Revision Act 1873 (36 & 37 Vict. c. 91))
Parliamentary Writs Act 1813 (repealed)	53 Geo. 3. c. 89	2 July 1813
An Act for the more regular Conveyance of Writs for the Election of Members to serve in Parliament. (Repealed by Parliament (Elections and Meeting) Act 1943 (6 & 7 Geo. 6. c. 48))
Militia Allowances Act 1813 (repealed)	53 Geo. 3. c. 90	2 July 1813
An Act to revive and continue, until the Twenty fifth Day of March One thousand eight hundred and fourteen, and amend so much of an Act, made in the Thirty ninth and Fortieth Year of His present Majesty, (Note: Militia Allowances Act 1800 (39 & 40 Geo. 3. c. 44)) as grants certain Allowances to Adjutants and Serjeant Majors of the Militia of England, disembodied under an Act of the same Session of Parliament. (Note: Militia Act 1799 (39 & 40 Geo. 3. c. 1))) (Repealed by Statute Law Revision Act 1873 (36 & 37 Vict. c. 91))
Militia Allowances (No. 2) Act 1813 (repealed)	53 Geo. 3. c. 91	2 July 1813
An Act for making Allowances in certain cases to Subaltern Officers of the Militia in Great Britain while disembodied. (Repealed by Statute Law Revision Act 1873 (36 & 37 Vict. c. 91))
Leases of Episcopal Lands (Ireland) Act 1813	53 Geo. 3. c. 92	2 July 1813
An Act for the Removal of Doubts respecting the Powers of Archbishops and Bishops in Ireland, as to demising the Mensal Lands, not being Demesne Lands, to their respective Sees belonging.
Lotteries Act 1813 (repealed)	53 Geo. 3. c. 93	2 July 1813
An Act for granting to His Majesty a Sum of Money to be raised by Lotteries. (Repealed by Statute Law Revision Act 1873 (36 & 37 Vict. c. 91))
Duty on Spirits (Ireland) Act 1813 (repealed)	53 Geo. 3. c. 94	6 July 1813
An Act to grant an additional Duty of Excise on Spirits made or distilled from Corn or Grain in Ireland. (Repealed by Statute Law Revision Act 1873 (36 & 37 Vict. c. 91))
National Debt Reduction Act 1813 (repealed)	53 Geo. 3. c. 95	6 July 1813
An Act to provide for the Charge of the Addition to the Public Funded Debt of Great Britain, in the Year One thousand eight hundred and thirteen. (Repealed by Statute Law Revision Act 1870 (33 & 34 Vict. c. 69))
Militia Pay (Great Britain) Act 1813 (repealed)	53 Geo. 3. c. 96	6 July 1813
An Act for defraying the Charge of the Pay and Clothing of the Militia and Local Militia in Great Britain for the Year One thousand eight hundred and thirteen. (Repealed by Statute Law Revision Act 1873 (36 & 37 Vict. c. 91))
Sale of Muriate of Potash, etc. Act 1813 (repealed)	53 Geo. 3. c. 97	7 July 1813
An Act for allowing Glass Makers to dispose of Muriate of Potash arising in the Manufacture of Flux for Glass, for use in the Manufacture of Alum, and for charging a Duty of Excise thereon. (Repealed by Statute Law Revision Act 1861 (24 & 25 Vict. c. 101))
Exportation (No. 6) Act 1813 (repealed)	53 Geo. 3. c. 98	7 July 1813
An Act for the more correct Ascertainment of the Value of Duty-free Goods exported. (Repealed by Customs Law Repeal Act 1825 (6 Geo. 4. c. 105))
Offences Committed by Soldiers Act 1813 (repealed)	53 Geo. 3. c. 99	7 July 1813
An Act for the more speedy and effectual Trial and Punishment of Offences committed by Soldiers detached in Places beyond the Seas out of His Majesty's Dominions. (Repealed by Statute Law Revision Act 1873 (36 & 37 Vict. c. 91))
Audit of Accounts Act 1813 (repealed)	53 Geo. 3. c. 100	7 July 1813
An Act for facilitating the making up and Audit of the Accounts of the Paymaster General of His Majesty's Forces for the Years One thousand eight hundred and five, One thousand eight hundred and six and One thousand eight hundred and seven, and for enabling the said Paymaster General to accept Foreign Bills of Exchange payable at the Bank of England. (Repealed by Statute Law Revision Act 1861 (24 & 25 Vict. c. 101))
Royal Canal Company (Ireland) Act 1813 (repealed)	53 Geo. 3. c. 101	7 July 1813
An Act to dissolve the Corporation of the Royal Canal Company in Ireland, and to appoint Commissioners for inquiring into and examining the Claims of the Creditors of the said Company, and other Matters relating to the said Company; and to provide for carrying on and completing the Canal from Dublin to Tarmonbury on the River Shannon. (Repealed by Statute Law Revision Act 1873 (36 & 37 Vict. c. 91))
Insolvent Debtors (England) Act 1813 (repealed)	53 Geo. 3. c. 102	10 July 1813
An Act for the Relief of Insolvent Debtors in England. (Repealed by Statute Law Revision Act 1873 (36 & 37 Vict. c. 91))
Excise (No. 4) Act 1813 (repealed)	53 Geo. 3. c. 103	10 July 1813
An Act to authorize the Commissioners to transfer Excise Licences to the Executors or Administrators of deceased Licensed Traders, or to their Successors, in the Houses from which such Licensed Traders shall have removed. (Repealed by Statute Law Revision Act 1861 (24 & 25 Vict. c. 101))
Duties on Sugar (Ireland) Act 1813 (repealed)	53 Geo. 3. c. 104	10 July 1813
An Act to permit the Entry into Ireland, for Home Consumption, of Sugar, the Produce or Manufacture of Martinique, Mariegalante, Guadaloupe, Saint Eustatia, Saint Martin and Saba, at a lower Rate of Duty than is payable upon Sugar not of the British Plantations. (Repealed by Statute Law Revision Act 1861 (24 & 25 Vict. c. 101))
Customs (No. 3) Act 1813 (repealed)	53 Geo. 3. c. 105	10 July 1813
An Act to explain and amend an Act of the present Session, (Note: Customs Act 1813 (53 Geo. 3. c. 33)) for granting additional Duties of Customs on Goods, Wares or Merchandize imported into and exported from Great Britain; for allowing a Drawback on Carrot Tobacco exported; for altering the Duties on Pearls imported; for repealing the additional Duty on Barilla granted by the said Act; for allowing a Drawback of the additional Duties of Customs on Timber used in the Tin, Lead and Copper Mines of Devon and Cornwall; for ascertaining the time when the Bounty on Goods exported may be claimed; for better preventing the Clandestine Exportation of Goods; and for appropriating the Duties on Sugar, the Produce of Martinique and other Places, granted by an Act of this Session. (Note: Duties on Sugar Act 1813 (53 Geo. 3. c. 62)) (Repealed by Customs Law Repeal Act 1825 (6 Geo. 4. c. 105))
Counterfeiting of Bank of Ireland Tokens Act 1813 (repealed)	53 Geo. 3. c. 106	10 July 1813
An Act to extend the Provisions of an Act made in the Forty fifth Year of His present Majesty's Reign, (Note: Counterfeiting Bank of Ireland Silver Tokens, etc. Act 1805 (45 Geo. 3. c. 42)) for preventing the Counterfeiting of certain Silver Tokens, to certain other Tokens which have been or may be issued by the Governor and Company of the Bank of Ireland. (Repealed by Statute Law Revision Act 1861 (24 & 25 Vict. c. 101))
Endowed Schools (Ireland) Act 1813 or the Endowed Schools Act 1813 (repealed)	53 Geo. 3. c. 107	10 July 1813
An Act for the Appointment of Commissioners for the Regulation of the several Endowed Schools of Public and Private Foundation in Ireland. (Repealed by Education (Northern Ireland) Order 1980 (SI 1980/1958))
Stamps Act 1813 (repealed)	53 Geo. 3. c. 108	10 July 1813
An Act for altering explaining and amending an Act of the Forty eighth Year of His Majesty's Reign, for granting Stamp Duties in Great Britain, with regard to the Duties on Re-issuable Promissory Notes, and on Conveyances on the Sale and Mortgage of Property; for better enabling the Commissioners of Stamps to give Relief in Cases of spoiled Stamps, and to remit Penalties; for exempting certain Instruments from Stamp Duty; and for better securing the Duties on Stage Coaches. (Repealed by Inland Revenue Repeal Act 1870 (33 & 34 Vict. c. 99))
Duties on Glass Act 1813 (repealed)	53 Geo. 3. c. 109	10 July 1813
An Act to continue until the First Day of August One thousand eight hundred and fourteen, several Laws relating to the Duties on Glass made in Great Britain. (Repealed by Statute Law Revision Act 1873 (36 & 37 Vict. c. 91))
Importation into Isle of Man Act 1813 (repealed)	53 Geo. 3. c. 110	10 July 1813
An Act to suspend the Exportation of Foreign Spirits from Great Britain to the Isle of Man under Licence from the Commissioners of Customs, and to permit the Exportation of a limited Quantity of Irish Spirits in lieu thereof, under Licence from the Commissioners of Customs and Port Duties in Ireland, from certain Ports of that Part of the Kingdom to the said Isle, until the Fifth Day of July One thousand eight hundred and fourteen. (Repealed by Statute Law Revision Act 1873 (36 & 37 Vict. c. 91))
Southern Whale Fishery Act 1813 (repealed)	53 Geo. 3. c. 111	10 July 1813
An Act for the more easy Manning of Ships and Vessels employed in the Southern Whale Fishery. (Repealed by Customs Law Repeal Act 1825 (6 Geo. 4. c. 105))
Slave Trade Act 1813 (repealed)	53 Geo. 3. c. 112	10 July 1813
An Act to enlarge the Time for commencing Prosecutions for Forfeitures under certain Acts relating to the Abolition of the Slave Trade. (Repealed by Statute Law Revision Act 1861 (24 & 25 Vict. c. 101))
Poor Prisoners Relief Act 1813 (repealed)	53 Geo. 3. c. 113	10 July 1813
An Act for providing Relief for the Poor Prisoners confined in the King's Bench, Fleet and Marshalsea, Prisons. (Repealed by County Contributions to Prisons, etc. Act 1861 (24 & 25 Vict. c. 12))
Issue, etc., of Gold and Silver Tokens (No. 2) Act 1813 (repealed)	53 Geo. 3. c. 114	10 July 1813
An Act to continue and amend an Act of the present Session, (Note: Issue, etc., of Gold and Silver Tokens Act 1813 (53 Geo. 3. c. 19)) to prevent the issuing and circulating of Pieces of Gold and Silver, or other Metal, usually called Tokens, except such as are issued by the Banks of England and Ireland respectively. (Repealed by Statute Law Revision Act 1861 (24 & 25 Vict. c. 101))
Firearms Act 1813 (repealed)	53 Geo. 3. c. 115	10 July 1813
An Act to insure the proper and careful manufacturing of Fire Arms in England; and for making Provision for proving the Barrels of such Fire Arms. (Repealed by Gun Barrel Proof Act 1855 (18 & 19 Vict. c. cxlviii))
Price, etc., of Bread Act 1813 (repealed)	53 Geo. 3. c. 116	10 July 1813
An Act to alter and amend Two Acts, of the Thirty first Year of King George the Second, (Note: Making of Bread Act 1757 (31 Geo. 2. c. 29)) and the Thirteenth Year of His present Majesty, (Note: Bread Act 1772 (13 Geo. 3. c. 62)) so far as relates to the Price and Assize of Bread to be sold out of the City of London and the Liberties thereof, and beyond the Weekly Bills of Mortality, and Ten Miles of the Royal Exchange. (Repealed by Statute Law Revision Act 1861 (24 & 25 Vict. c. 101))
Bridges (Scotland) Act 1813 (repealed)	53 Geo. 3. c. 117	10 July 1813
An Act to prevent Damage to certain Bridges in Scotland from the floating of Timber. (Repealed by Statute Law (Repeals) Act 1973 (c. 39))
Exchequer Bills (No. 4) Act 1813 (repealed)	53 Geo. 3. c. 118	10 July 1813
An Act for raising the Sum of Five millions six hundred and seventy thousand and seven hundred Pounds, by Exchequer Bills for the Service of Great Britain, for the Year One thousand eight hundred and thirteen. (Repealed by Statute Law Revision Act 1873 (36 & 37 Vict. c. 91))
Exchequer Bills (No. 5) Act 1813 (repealed)	53 Geo. 3. c. 119	10 July 1813
An Act for raising the Sum of One Million, by Exchequer Bills, for the Service of Great Britain, for the Year One thousand eight hundred and thirteen. (Repealed by Statute Law Revision Act 1873 (36 & 37 Vict. c. 91))
National Debt of Ireland Reduction Act 1813 (repealed)	53 Geo. 3. c. 120	10 July 1813
An Act to enable the Lords of the Treasury of Ireland to issue to the Commissioners for the Reduction of the National Debt, a Sum equal to One per Centum on the Amount of Treasury Bills outstanding in every Year. (Repealed by Statute Law Revision Act 1861 (24 & 25 Vict. c. 101))
New Street Act 1813 or the Communications from Marylebone to Charing Cross Act 1813	53 Geo. 3. c. 121	10 July 1813
An Act for making a more convenient Communication from Mary le Bone Park and the Northern Parts of the Metropolis, in the Parish of Saint Mary le Bone to Charing Cross, within the Liberty of Westminster; and for making a more convenient Sewage for the same.
Spencer Perceval's Pensions Act 1813 (repealed)	53 Geo. 3. c. 122	10 July 1813
An Act for confirming the Renunciation made by Spencer Perceval Esquire of his Pensions on his taking the Office of a Teller of the Exchequer. (Note: Teller of the Receipt of the Exchequer.) (Repealed by Statute Law Revision Act 1873 (36 & 37 Vict. c. 91))
Land Tax Redemption Act 1813 (repealed)	53 Geo. 3. c. 123	12 July 1813
An Act to amend and render more effectual several Acts passed for the Redemption and Sale of the Land Tax. (Repealed by Statute Law (Repeals) Act 1989 (c. 43))
Salt Duty Act 1813 (repealed)	53 Geo. 3. c. 124	12 July 1813
An Act for allowing the Use of Salt, Duty-free, for curing Conger, Polock, Bream, Ray and Scate. (Repealed by Statute Law Revision Act 1861 (24 & 25 Vict. c. 101))
Exportation (No. 7) Act 1813 (repealed)	53 Geo. 3. c. 125	12 July 1813
An Act to allow a Bounty upon the Exportation of Stuffs of Silk ornamented with Embroidery, Tambour, Needle Work, Lace or Fringe; and upon the Exportation of Ribbons made of Silk mixed with Incle or Cotton. (Repealed by Customs Law Repeal Act 1825 (6 Geo. 4. c. 105))
Embezzlement of Public Stores Act 1813 (repealed)	53 Geo. 3. c. 126	12 July 1813
An Act to extend the Provisions of an Act of the Ninth and Tenth Year of King William the Third, (Note: Embezzlement of Public Stores Act 1697 (9 Will. 3. c. 41)) for preventing the Embezzlement of Stores of War, to all Public Stores. (Repealed by Embezzlement of Public Stores Act 1815 (55 Geo. 3. c. 127))
Ecclesiastical Courts Act 1813 (repealed)	53 Geo. 3. c. 127	12 July 1813
An Act for the better Regulation of Ecclesiastical Courts in England; and for the more easy Recovery of Church Rates and Tithes. (Repealed by Statute Law (Repeals) Act 1971 (c. 52))
Roman Catholic Relief Act 1813 (repealed)	53 Geo. 3. c. 128	12 July 1813
An Act to relieve from the Operation of the Statute of the Twenty fifth Year of the Reign of King Charles the Second, intituled "An Act for preventing Dangers which may happen from Popish Recusants", (Note: Popish Recusants Act 1672 (25 Cha. 2. c. 2)) all such of His Majesty's Popish or Roman Catholic Subjects of Ireland as, by virtue of the Act of Parliament of Ireland of the Thirty third Year of His Majesty's Reign, intituled "An Act for the Relief of His Majesty's Popish or Roman Catholic Subjects of Ireland", (Note: Roman Catholic Relief Act 1793 (33 Geo. 3. c. 21 (I))) hold, exercise or enjoy any Civil or Military Offices or Places of Trust or Profit, or any other Office whatsoever, of which His Majesty's said Subjects are by the said Act of Parliament of Ireland rendered capable. (Repealed by Statute Law Revision Act 1861 (24 & 25 Vict. c. 101))
Six Clerks in Chancery (Ireland) Act 1813 (repealed)	53 Geo. 3. c. 129	12 July 1813
An Act to amend an Act made in the Forty ninth Year of His Majesty's Reign, (Note: Sale of Offices Act 1809 (49 Geo. 3. c. 126)) for the further Prevention of the Sale and Brokerage of Offices, so far as relates to the Offices of the Six Clerks in the Court of Chancery in Ireland. (Repealed by Statute Law Revision Act 1861 (24 & 25 Vict. c. 101))
Inquiry into Public Offices (Ireland) Act 1813 (repealed)	53 Geo. 3. c. 130	12 July 1813
An Act to continue until the First Day of January One thousand eight hundred and fourteen, or in case Parliament shall not have assembled before the said First Day of January, then until Three Weeks after the then next Meeting of Parliament, certain Acts for appointing Commissioners to enquire into the Fees, Gratuities, Perquisites and Emoluments received in several Public Offices in Ireland, to examine into any Abuses which may exist in the same, and into the mode of receiving collecting issuing and accounting for Public Money in Ireland. (Repealed by Statute Law Revision Act 1873 (36 & 37 Vict. c. 91))
Court Houses (Ireland) Act 1813 (repealed)	53 Geo. 3. c. 131	12 July 1813
An Act to make further Regulations for the Building and Repairing of Court Houses and Sessions Houses in Ireland. (Repealed by Statute Law Revision Act 1873 (36 & 37 Vict. c. 91))
Militia (Tower Hamlets) Act 1813 (repealed)	53 Geo. 3. c. 132	12 July 1813
An Act to extend the Services of the Militia of the Tower Hamlets to all Parts of the United Kingdom. (Repealed by Statute Law Revision Act 1873 (36 & 37 Vict. c. 91) and Militia Act 1882 (45 & 46 Vict. c. 49))
Purchase of Estate for Duke of Wellington Act 1813 (repealed)	53 Geo. 3. c. 133	12 July 1813
An Act to amend an Act of the present Session of Parliament, (Note: Purchase of Estate for Duke of Wellington Act 1812 (53 Geo. 3. c. 4)) for granting a Sum of Money for purchasing an Estate for the Marquis of Wellington and his Heirs, in consideration of the eminent and signal Services performed by the said Marquis Wellington to His Majesty and the Public. (Repealed by Wellington Estate Act 1972 (c. 1))
Settlement of Estate on Lord Nelson Act 1813	53 Geo. 3. c. 134	12 July 1813
An Act to amend an Act of the Forty sixth Year of His present Majesty, (Note: Lord Nelson (Annuity) Act 1806 (46 Geo. 3. c. 146)) for settling and securing a certain Annuity, and for purchasing an Estate for the Earl Nelson.
Bringing of Coals to London, etc. Act 1813 (repealed)	53 Geo. 3. c. 135	12 July 1813
An Act to continue until the First Day of August One thousand eight hundred and fifteen, Two Acts of the Forty fifth (Note: Bringing of Coals, etc., to London, etc. Act 1805 (45 Geo. 3. c. 128)) and Fiftieth (Note: Bringing of Coals, etc., to London, etc. Act 1810 (50 Geo. 3. c. 110)) Years of His present Majesty, allowing the bringing of Coals, Culm and Cinders to London and Westminster by Inland Navigation. (Repealed by Statute Law Revision Act 1873 (36 & 37 Vict. c. 91))
Appropriation Act 1813 (repealed)	53 Geo. 3. c. 136	12 July 1813
An Act for granting to His Majesty certain Sums of Money out of the Consolidated Fund of Great Britain; and for applying certain Monies therein mentioned, for the Service of the Year One thousand eight hundred and thirteen; and for further appropriating the Supplies granted in this Session of Parliament. (Repealed by Statute Law Revision Act 1873 (36 & 37 Vict. c. 91))
Sale of Spirituous Liquors, etc. (Ireland) Act 1813 (repealed)	53 Geo. 3. c. 137	13 July 1813
An Act to amend the several Acts for regulating Licences for the Sale of Spirituous Liquors, Wine, Beer, Ale and Cyder, by Retail in Ireland. (Repealed by Statute Law Revision Act 1861 (24 & 25 Vict. c. 101))
Insolvent Debtors (Ireland) Act 1813 (repealed)	53 Geo. 3. c. 138	13 July 1813
An Act for the Relief of Insolvent Debtors in Ireland. (Repealed by Statute Law Revision Act 1873 (36 & 37 Vict. c. 91))
Exemption of Bankers from Penalties Act 1813 (repealed)	53 Geo. 3. c. 139	13 July 1813
An Act for exempting Bankers, and others from certain Penalties contained in an Act of the last Session of Parliament, (Note: Counterfeiting Tokens, etc. Act 1812 (52 Geo. 3. c. 138)) for the further Prevention of the Counterfeiting of Silver Tokens issued by the Governor and Company of the Bank of England, called Dollars and of Silver Pieces issued and circulated by the Governor and Company, called Tokens; and for the further Prevention of Frauds practised by the Imitation of the Notes or Bills of the said Governor and Company. (Repealed by Statute Law Revision Act 1873 (36 & 37 Vict. c. 91))
Cinque Ports Pilots Act 1813 (repealed)	53 Geo. 3. c. 140	13 July 1813
An Act to amend an Act passed in the last Session of Parliament, intituled "An Act for the more effectual Regulation of Pilots, and of the Pilotage of Ships and Vessels on the Coast of England," (Note: Pilotage Act 1812 (52 Geo. 3. c. 39)) and for the Regulation of Boatmen employed in supplying Vessels with Pilots licensed under the said Act, so far as relates to the Coast of Kent, within the Limits of The Cinque Ports. (Repealed by Statute Law Revision Act 1861 (24 & 25 Vict. c. 101))
Inrolment of Grants of Annuities Act 1813 (repealed)	53 Geo. 3. c. 141	14 July 1813
An Act to repeal an Act of the Seventeenth Year of the Reign of His present Majesty, intituled "An Act for registering the Grants of Life Annuities, and for the better Protection of Infants against such Grants," (Note: Grants of Life Annuities Act 1776 (17 Geo. 3. c. 26)) and to substitute other Provisions in lieu thereof. (Repealed by Usury Laws Repeal Act 1854 (17 & 18 Vict. c. 90))
Land Tax Act 1813 (repealed)	53 Geo. 3. c. 142	14 July 1813
An Act to explain and amend several Acts relative to the Land Tax. (Repealed by Finance Act 1949 (12, 13 & 14 Geo. 6. c. 47))
Grand Canal (Ireland) Act 1813	53 Geo. 3. c. 143	14 July 1813
An Act to direct the Application of the Sum of Fifty thousand Pounds, and of such further Sums as may be granted for the Benefit of the Company of Undertakers of The Grand Canal, in Ireland.
Inland Navigation (Ireland) Act 1813 (repealed)	53 Geo. 3. c. 144	14 July 1813
An Act to amend an Act of the Parliament of Ireland of the Fortieth Year of His present Majesty, (Note: Inland Navigation Act 1800 (40 Geo. 3. c. 51 (I))) for promoting Inland Navigation in Ireland. (Repealed by Statute Law Revision Act 1873 (36 & 37 Vict. c. 91))
Distillation of Spirits (Ireland) Act 1813 (repealed)	53 Geo. 3. c. 145	20 July 1813
An Act to amend the several Acts for regulating the Distillation of Spirits in Ireland. (Repealed by Statute Law Revision Act 1861 (24 & 25 Vict. c. 101))
Highways (Ireland) (No. 2) Act 1813 (repealed)	53 Geo. 3. c. 146	20 July 1813
An Act to amend an Act made in the Forty fifth Year of His present Majesty, intituled "An Act to amend the Laws for improving and keeping in Repair the Post Roads in Ireland, and for rendering the Conveyance of Letters by His Majesty's Post Office more secure and expeditious." (Note: Highways (Ireland) Act 1805 (45 Geo. 3. c. 43)) (Repealed by Statute Law Revision Act 1873 (36 & 37 Vict. c. 91))
Duties on Spirits (Great Britain) Act 1813 (repealed)	53 Geo. 3. c. 147	20 July 1813
An Act for the better securing the Excise Duties on Spirits in Great Britain, and for rectifying a Mistake in an Act of the last Session of Parliament, (Note: Distillation of Spirits Act 1812 (52 Geo. 3. c. 3)) for granting certain Duties on Worts or Wash made from Sugar. (Repealed by Statute Law Revision Act 1861 (24 & 25 Vict. c. 101))
Distillation of Spirits (Ireland) (No. 2) Act 1813 (repealed)	53 Geo. 3. c. 148	20 July 1813
An Act to provide for the more effectually preventing the Illicit Distillation of Spirits in Ireland. (Repealed by Statute Law Revision Act 1861 (24 & 25 Vict. c. 101))
Stipendiary Curates Act 1813 (repealed)	53 Geo. 3. c. 149	20 July 1813
An Act for the further Support and Maintenance of Stipendiary Curates. (Repealed by Residence on Benefices, etc. (England) Act 1817 (57 Geo. 3. c. 99))
Audit of Accounts, etc. Act 1813 (repealed)	53 Geo. 3. c. 150	20 July 1813
An Act for the more speedy and effectual Examination and Audit of the Accounts of Military Expenditure in Spain and Portugal, for removing Delays in passing the Public Accounts, and for making new Arrangements for conducting the Business of the Audit Office. (Repealed by Exchequer and Audit Departments Act 1866 (29 & 30 Vict. c. 39))
Registry of Admiralty Court Act 1813 (repealed)	53 Geo. 3. c. 151	20 July 1813
An Act for regulating the Office of Registrar of the High Court of Admiralty, and High Court of Appeals for Prizes. (Repealed by Statute Law Revision Act 1873 (36 & 37 Vict. c. 91))
Westminster Election Act 1813 (repealed)	53 Geo. 3. c. 152	20 July 1813
An Act to continue until the First Day of January One thousand eight hundred and nineteen, an Act made in the Fifty first Year of His present Majesty, (Note: Westminster Parliamentary Elections Act 1811 (51 Geo. 3. c. 126)) to explain and amend the Laws touching the Elections of Knights of the Shire to serve in Parliament for England, respecting the Expences of Hustings and Poll Clerks so far as regards the City of Westminster. (Repealed by Statute Law Revision Act 1873 (36 & 37 Vict. c. 91))
Judges' Pensions Act 1813 (repealed)	53 Geo. 3. c. 153	20 July 1813
An Act to enable His Majesty to grant additional Annuities to the Judges of the Courts in Westminster Hall, on their Resignation of their Offices. (Repealed by Supreme Court of Judicature (Consolidation) Act 1925 (15 & 16 Geo. 5. c. 49))
Kilmainham Hospital (Pensions Commutation) Act 1813 (repealed)	53 Geo. 3. c. 154	20 July 1813
An Act to render valid, and to authorize the Payment and granting of certain Pensions at Kilmainham Hospital, and to empower the Commissioners of the said Hospital to commute Pensions for a Sum of Money in certain Cases. (Repealed by Statute Law (Repeals) Act 1976 (c. 16))
East India Company Act 1813 or the Charter Act 1813 (repealed)	53 Geo. 3. c. 155	21 July 1813
An Act for continuing in the East India Company, for a further Term, the Possession of the British Territories in India, together with certain exclusive Privileges; for establishing further Regulations for the Government of the said Territories, and the better Administration of Justice within the same; and for regulating the Trade to and from the Places within the Limits of the said Company's Charter. (Repealed by Government of India Act 1915 (5 & 6 Geo. 5. c. 61))
Charge of Certain Annuities Act 1813 (repealed)	53 Geo. 3. c. 156	21 July 1813
An Act to provide for the Payment of the Charge of the Annuities created in respect of the Sum of Six Millions granted for the Service of Ireland, for the Year One thousand eight hundred and thirteen. (Repealed by Statute Law Revision Act 1861 (24 & 25 Vict. c. 101))
Grant of John Palmer, Esquire (Post Office Services) Act 1813 (repealed)	53 Geo. 3. c. 157	21 July 1813
An Act for granting the Sum of Fifty thousand Pounds to John Palmer Esquire, in consideration of the Public Services performed by the said John Palmer, in the Improvement of the Post Office Revenue. (Repealed by Statute Law Revision Act 1873 (36 & 37 Vict. c. 91))
Windsor Forest Act 1813	53 Geo. 3. c. 158	21 July 1813
An Act for vesting in His Majesty certain parts of Windsor Forest in the county of Berks; and for inclosing the open commonable lands within the said forest.
Responsibility of Shipowners Act 1813 (repealed)	53 Geo. 3. c. 159	21 July 1813
An Act to limit the Responsibility of Ship Owners in certain cases. (Repealed by Merchant Shipping Repeal Act 1854 (17 & 18 Vict. c. 120))
Doctrine of the Trinity Act 1813 (repealed)	53 Geo. 3. c. 160	21 July 1813
An Act to relieve Persons who impugn the Doctrine of the Holy Trinity from certain Penalties. (Repealed by Statute Law Revision Act 1873 (36 & 37 Vict. c. 91))
Exchequer Bills, etc. Act 1813 (repealed)	53 Geo. 3. c. 161	22 July 1813
An Act for enabling His Majesty to raise the Sum of Five Millions for the Service of Great Britain; and for applying the Sum of Two hundred thousand Pounds British Currency for the Service of Ireland. (Repealed by Statute Law Revision Act 1873 (36 & 37 Vict. c. 91))
Imprisonment with Hard Labour Act 1813 (repealed)	53 Geo. 3. c. 162	22 July 1813
An Act to repeal a certain Provision respecting Persons convicted of Felony without Benefit of Clergy, contained in an Act made in the Fifty-second Year of the Reign of His present Majesty, (Note: Penitentiary House, etc. Act 1812 (52 Geo. 3. c. 44)) for the Erection of a Penitentiary House for the Confinement of Persons convicted within the City of London and County of Middlesex, and for making other Provisions in lieu thereof. (Repealed by Statute Law Revision Act 1873 (36 & 37 Vict. c. 91))

=== Local acts ===
Short title	Citation	Royal assent
Long title
Rochdale and Bury Road Act 1813 (repealed)	53 Geo. 3. c. i	23 March 1813
An Act to enlarge the Term and Powers of an Act of His present Majesty, (Note: Rochdale and Bury and Sudden Roads Act 1797 (37 Geo. 3. c. 146)) for repairing the Road from the Guide Post near Sudden Bridge, in the Parish of Rochdale, to Bury, and a Branch therefrom, all in the County Palatine of Lancaster. (Repealed by Rochdale and Bury Road Act 1833 (3 & 4 Will. 4. c. viii))
Tiverton Roads Act 1813 (repealed)	53 Geo. 3. c. ii	23 March 1813
An Act for enlarging the Powers of an Act of His present Majesty, (Note: Tiverton Roads Act 1811 (51 Geo. 3. c. xlviii)) for repairing Roads leading to and from Tiverton, in the County of Devon, and for making a new Road to communicate therewith. (Repealed by Tiverton Roads Act 1830 (11 Geo. 4 & 1 Will. 4. c. xcvii))
Dunsford and Cherrybrook Road Act 1813 (repealed)	53 Geo. 3. c. iii	23 March 1813
An Act for enlarging the Term and Powers of Two Acts of His present Majesty, (Note: Devon Roads (No. 2) Act 1772 (12 Geo. 3. c. 93)) (Note: Devon Roads Act 1791 (31 Geo. 3. c. 117)) for repairing the Road from the Exeter Turnpike at Reedy Gate in the Parish of Dunsford, to Cherrybrook in the Forest of Dartmoore, in the County of Devon. (Repealed by Dunsford and Cherry Brook Road (Devon) Act 1833 (3 & 4 Will. 4. c. vi))
Little Bowden and Rockingham Road Act 1813 (repealed)	53 Geo. 3. c. iv	23 March 1813
An Act for enlarging the Term and Powers of an Act of His present Majesty, (Note: Little Bowden and Rockingham Road Act 1793 (33 Geo. 3. c. 143)) for repairing the Road from Little Bowden, in the County of Northampton, to Rockingham, in the said County. (Repealed by Little Bowden and Rockingham Road Act 1835 (5 & 6 Will. 4. c. xix))
Maisemore Bridge Act 1813	53 Geo. 3. c. v	23 March 1813
An Act for altering and enlarging the Powers of an Act of the Seventeenth Year of His present Majesty, (Note: Maisemore Bridge Act 1777 (17 Geo. 3. c. 68)) for building a Bridge at Maismore, in the County of Gloucester.
Road from Coventry to Rugby Act 1813	53 Geo. 3. c. vi	23 March 1813
An Act for repairing the Road from the City of Coventry to the Rugby Turnpike Road, in the Parish of Wolvey, in the County of Warwick.
Roads in Glamorgan Act 1813 (repealed)	53 Geo. 3. c. vii	23 March 1813
An Act for continuing and amending Two Acts of His present Majesty, (Note: Glamorgan Roads Act 1771 (11 Geo. 3. c. 77)) (Note: Glamorgan Roads Act 1779 (19 Geo. 3. c. 110)) for repairing several Roads in the County of Glamorgan, so far as they relate to the Roads comprized in the Llantrissent District. (Repealed by Turnpike Trusts in South Wales Act 1844 (7 & 8 Vict. c. 91))
Kilmarnock Improvement Act 1813	53 Geo. 3. c. viii	23 March 1813
An Act for altering and enlarging the Provisions of an Act of His present Majesty, (Note: Kilmarnock Improvement Act 1802 (42 Geo. 3. c. xlviii)) for improving the Town of Kilmarnock, in the County of Ayr.
Norwich and North Walsham Road Act 1813 (repealed)	53 Geo. 3. c. ix	23 March 1813
An Act for enlarging the Term and Powers of an Act of His present Majesty, (Note: Norwich and North Walsham Road Act 1797 (37 Geo. 3. c. 147)) for repairing the Road from the City of Norwich to North Walsham, in the County of Norfolk. (Repealed by Norwich and North Walsham Road Act 1831 (1 Will. 4. c. xxxii))
Norwich and Swaffham Road Act 1813 (repealed)	53 Geo. 3. c. x	23 March 1813
An Act for enlarging the Term and Powers of Two Acts of His present Majesty, (Note: Norwich and Swaffham Road Act 1770 (10 Geo. 3. c. 67)) (Note: Norwich and Swaffham Road Act 1792 (32 Geo. 3. c. 112)) for repairing the Road from the City of Norwich to Swaffham, and from Honingham to Yaxham, in the County of Norfolk and also a Lane called Hangman's Lane, near the Gates of the said City. (Repealed by Norwich and Swaffham Road Act 1835 (5 & 6 Will. 4. c. xl))
Road from Bawtry and from Little Drayton Act 1813	53 Geo. 3. c. xi	23 March 1813
An Act for enlarging the Term and Powers of Two Acts of His present Majesty, (Note: Bawtry to Markham Road Act 1766 (6 Geo. 3. c. 67)) (Note: Bawtry to Markham Road Act 1793 (33 Geo. 3. c. 136)) for repairing and widening the Road from Bawtry, in the County of York, to East Markham Common, in the County of Nottingham, and from Little Drayton to Twyford Bridge, in the said County of Nottingham.
Dunham Ferry and Great Markham Common Road Act 1813	53 Geo. 3. c. xii	23 March 1813
An Act for enlarging the Term and Powers of Two Acts of His present Majesty, (Note: Dunham Ferry and Great Markham Common Road Act 1765 (5 Geo. 3. c. 54)) (Note: Dunham Ferry and Great Markham Common Road Act 1791 (31 Geo. 3. c. 131)) for repairing and widening the Road from Dunham Ferry to the South End of Great Markham Common, in the County of Nottingham.
Lanark and Hamilton Road Act 1813 (repealed)	53 Geo. 3. c. xiii	23 March 1813
An Act for continuing the Term and altering and enlarging the Powers of an Act made in the Thirty second Year of His present Majesty, (Note: Lanark and Hamilton Roads Act 1792 (32 Geo. 3. c. 122)) for making and repairing the Road from the Town of Lanark to the Town of Hamilton, in the County of Lanark. (Repealed by Lanark Roads and Crossford Bridge Act 1834 (4 & 5 Will. 4. c. lxxii))
Geist Inclosure Act 1813	53 Geo. 3. c. xiv	23 March 1813
An Act for inclosing Lands in the Parish of Geist, in the County of Norfolk.
Fawley Inclosure Act 1813	53 Geo. 3. c. xv	23 March 1813
An Act for inclosing Lands in the Parish of Fawley, in the County of Southampton.
Witham-on-the-Hill, Manthorpe, Toft and Lound Inclosures Act 1813	53 Geo. 3. c. xvi	23 March 1813
An Act for inclosing Lands in the Parish of Witham on the Hill, with Manthorpe, Toft and Lound, in the County of Lincoln.
Askham Richard Inclosure Act 1813	53 Geo. 3. c. xvii	23 March 1813
An Act for inclosing Lands in the Parish of Askham Richard, in the County of the City of York.
Haburgh Inclosure Act 1813	53 Geo. 3. c. xviii	23 March 1813
An Act for inclosing Lands in the Parish of Haburgh, in the County of Lincoln.
Wey and Arun Junction Canal Act 1813	53 Geo. 3. c. xix	1 April 1813
An Act for making and maintaining a Navigable Canal, to unite the Rivers Wey and Arun, in the Counties of Surry and Sussex.
Manchester and Salford Water Act 1813	53 Geo. 3. c. xx	1 April 1813
An Act for enlarging the Powers of an Act of His present Majesty, (Note: Manchester and Salford Water Act 1809 (49 Geo. 3. c. cxcii)) for supplying with Water the Towns of Manchester and Salford, in the County Palatine of Lancaster.
St. Mary Islington Poor Relief and Workhouse Act 1813 (repealed)	53 Geo. 3. c. xxi	1 April 1813
An Act for altering and amending Two Acts of the Seventeenth (Note: Islington (Poor Relief, etc.) Act 1776 (17 Geo. 3. c. 5)) and Forty second (Note: St. Mary Islington Poor Relief Act 1802 (42 Geo. 3. c. xxviii)) Years of His present Majesty, for the better Relief and Employment of the Poor of the Parish of Saint Mary Islington, in the County of Middlesex, and for building a Work house for the said Parish. (Repealed by St. Mary Islington Improvement Act 1824 (5 Geo. 4. c. cxxv))
Battle and Robertsbridge Road Act 1813 (repealed)	53 Geo. 3. c. xxii	1 April 1813
An Act for making a Road from Beach Down near Battle, to Heathfield, and from Robertsbridge, to Hood's Corner, all in the County of Sussex. (Repealed by Battle and Robertsbridge Road Act 1852 (15 & 16 Vict. c. lxxxi))
Market Harborough and Loughborough Road Act 1813 (repealed)	53 Geo. 3. c. xxiii	1 April 1813
An Act for enlarging the Term and Powers of Two Acts of His present Majesty, (Note: Leicester Roads Act 1771 (11 Geo. 3. c. 88)) (Note: Market Harborough to Loughborough Road Act 1793 (33 Geo. 3. c. 176)) for repairing the Roads from Market Harborough to Loughborough, and from Filling Gate to the Melton Mowbray Turnpike Road, in the County of Leicester. (Repealed by Roads from Market Harborough to Loughborough Act 1830 (11 Geo. 4 & 1 Will. 4. c. iii))
Aldeburgh Roads Act 1813 (repealed)	53 Geo. 3. c. xxiv	1 April 1813
An Act for enlarging the Term and Powers of an Act of His present Majesty, (Note: Suffolk Roads Act 1792 (32 Geo. 3. c. 126)) for repairing the Roads leading from the Parishes of Yoxford, Saxmundham and Benhall, in the County of Suffolk, to the Town of Aldeburgh, in the said County. (Repealed by Statute Law (Repeals) Act 2008 (c. 12))
Bowes and Sunderland Bridge Road Act 1813	53 Geo. 3. c. xxv	1 April 1813
An Act for continuing and amending an Act of His present Majesty, (Note: Yorkshire and Durham Roads Act 1792 (32 Geo. 3. c. 135)) for repairing the Roads leading from Bowes in the County of York, through Barnard Castle and Bishop Auckland, to join the Great North Road near Sunderland Bridge, in the County of Durham.
Roads from Tavistock to Plymouth and from Manadon Gate Act 1813 (repealed)	53 Geo. 3. c. xxvi	1 April 1813
An Act for altering and enlarging the Term and Powers of an Act, of the Forty fourth Year of His present Majesty, for repairing the Roads leading from Tavistock to Old Town Gate, in the Borough of Plymouth, and from Manadon Gate to the Old Pound near Plymouth Dock, in the County of Devon. (Note: Roads from Tavistock to Plymouth and from Manadon Gate Act 1804 (44 Geo. 3. c. xvi)) (Repealed by Plymouth and Tavistock Turnpike Roads Act 1847 (10 & 11 Vict. c. xlvii))
Hertford and Ware Roads Act 1813 (repealed)	53 Geo. 3. c. xxvii	1 April 1813
An Act for continuing and amending Five Acts (Note: Hertford and Ware Roads Act 1724 (11 Geo. 1. c. 11)) (Note: Hertford and Ware Roads Act 1732 (6 Geo. 2. c. 15)) (Note: Hertford and Ware Roads Act 1753 (26 Geo. 2. c. 56)) (Note: Middlesex and Hertford Roads Act 1772 (12 Geo. 3. c. 84)) (Note: Enfield and Hertford and Hertford and Ware Roads Act 1799 (39 Geo. 3. c. xix)) passed for repairing several Roads leading from the Towns of Hertford and Ware, and other Places, in the County of Hertford. (Repealed by Roads from Hertford and Ware Act 1833 (3 & 4 Will. 4. c. xlii))
Hereford Cathedral and Sommers' Estate Act 1813	53 Geo. 3. c. xxviii	1 April 1813
An Act for effecting an Exchange between the Dean and Chapter of the Cathedral Church of Hereford, and the Right Honourable John Sommers Lord Sommers, of certain Estates in the County of Hereford.
Buglawton Inclosure Act 1813	53 Geo. 3. c. xxix	1 April 1813
An Act for inclosing Lands in the Manor and Township of Buglawton, in the County of Chester.
Rollesby Inclosure Act 1813	53 Geo. 3. c. xxx	1 April 1813
An Act for inclosing Lands in the Parish of Rollesby, in the County of Norfolk.
Melksham Inclosure Act 1813	53 Geo. 3. c. xxxi	1 April 1813
An Act for inclosing Lands in the Parish of Melksham, in the County of Wilts.
Regent's Canal Act 1813 (repealed)	53 Geo. 3. c. xxxii	15 April 1813
An Act to amend an Act of the last Session of Parliament (Note: Regent's Canal Act 1812 (52 Geo. 3. c. cxcv)) for making and maintaining a navigable Canal from the Grand Junction Canal, in the Parish of Paddington, to the River Thames in the Parish of Limehouse, with a Collateral Cut in the Parish of Saint Leonard Shoreditch, in the County of Middlesex. (Repealed by Grand Union Canal Act 1943 (6 & 7 Geo. 6. c. v))
Leith Harbour Act 1813 (repealed)	53 Geo. 3. c. xxxiii	15 April 1813
An Act for raising a further Sum of Money for the Improvement of the Harbour of Leith, and Works therewith connected. (Repealed by Leith Harbour and Docks Act 1875 (38 & 39 Vict. c. clx))
Porthleven Harbour Act 1813	53 Geo. 3. c. xxxiv	15 April 1813
An Act for explaining and amending an Act of His present Majesty, (Note: Porthleven Harbour Act 1811 (51 Geo. 3. c. cxcv)) for constructing a Harbour at Porthleven in Mount's Bay, in the County of Cornwall.
Hartlepool Pier and Port Act 1813 (repealed)	53 Geo. 3. c. xxxv	15 April 1813
An Act for improving the Pier and Port of Hartlepool, in the County of Durham. (Repealed by Hartlepool Pier and Port Act 1851 (14 & 15 Vict. c. cxvii))
West Middlesex Waterworks Act 1813	53 Geo. 3. c. xxxvi	15 April 1813
An Act to authorize the Company of Proprietors of the West Middlesex Waterworks to raise a further Sum of Money, for enabling them more effectually to carry on their Works.
Mile End New Town Poor Relief Act 1813 (repealed)	53 Geo. 3. c. xxxvii	15 April 1813
An Act for enlarging the Powers of an Act of His present Majesty, (Note: Stepney (Poor Relief, etc.) Act 1780 (20 Geo. 3. c. 66)) for the better Relief and Employment of the Poor of the Hamlet of Mile End New Town, in the Parish of Stepney, in the County of Middlesex, and other Purposes;, and for better collecting the Poor Rates in the said Hamlet. (Repealed by London Government (Borough of Stepney) Order in Council 1901 (SR&O 1901/276))
St. George Hanover Square Improvement Act 1813 (repealed)	53 Geo. 3. c. xxxviii	15 April 1813
An Act for more effectually paving, cleansing, lighting, watching and regulating certain Parts of Piccadilly and Park Lane, in the Parish of Saint George Hanover Square, in the County of Middlesex; and also the several Squares, Streets, Lanes and other public Passages and Places within the said Parish; and for altering and enlarging the Powers of an Act of the Twenty ninth Year of His present Majesty, (Note: St. George Hanover Square Improvement Act 1789 (29 Geo. 3. c. 75)) relative to the above Purposes, and to the Poor of the said Parish. (Repealed by St. George Hanover Square Improvement Act 1826 (7 Geo. 4. c. cxxi))
High Roads in Selkirk Act 1813 (repealed)	53 Geo. 3. c. xxxix	15 April 1813
An Act for amending an Act passed in the Forty first Year of His present Majesty, (Note: Selkirk County Roads Act 1801 (41 Geo. 3. (U.K.) c. xvii)) respecting the High Roads in the County of Selkirk. (Repealed by Selkirkshire Roads Act 1867 (30 & 31 Vict. c. xlvii))
West Auckland and Elishaw Road Act 1813 (repealed)	53 Geo. 3. c. xl	15 April 1813
An Act for more effectually amending, widening and keeping in Repair, the Road leading from the North End of the Turnpike Road called The Coal Road, near West Auckland, in the County of Durham, to the Elsdon Turnpike Road, at or near Elishaw, in the County of Northumberland. (Repealed by West Auckland and Elishaw Road (Durham, Northumberland) Act 1833 (3 & 4 Will. 4. c. lvi))
Godmanchester and Cambridge Road Act 1813 (repealed)	53 Geo. 3. c. xli	15 April 1813
An Act for more effectually repairing the Road from the Horseshoe Corner, in Godmanchester, in the County of Huntingdon, to the South East End of Castle Street, in the Town of Cambridge, in the County of Cambridge. (Repealed by Cambridge to Newmarket Heath Road Act 1815 (55 Geo. 3. c. xlix))
Road from Burford to Lechlade Act 1813 (repealed)	53 Geo. 3. c. xlii	15 April 1813
An Act for enlarging the Term and Powers of an Act of His present Majesty, (Note: Gloucester and Wiltshire Roads Act 1792 (32 Geo. 3. c. 153)) for repairing the Road from Burford, in the County of Oxford, to Leachlade, in the County of Gloucester; and also the Road from thence through Highworth to the Gricklade and Swindon Turnpike Road, in the County of Wilts. (Repealed by Burford, Lechdale and Swindon Turnpike Roads Act 1853 (16 & 17 Vict. c. civ))
Westerham and Godstone Road Act 1813	53 Geo. 3. c. xliii	15 April 1813
An Act for enlarging the Term and Powers of Two Acts of His present Majesty, (Note: Kent and Surrey Roads Act 1770 (10 Geo. 3. c. 62)) (Note: Kent and Surrey Roads Act 1792 (32 Geo. 3. c. 151)) for repairing the Road from the Eaton Bridge Turnpike Road at Cockham Hill, in the Parish of Westerham, in the County of Kent, to the Turnpike Road from Croydon to Godstone, in the County of Surry.
Great Marlow and Stokenchurch Road Act 1813	53 Geo. 3. c. xliv	15 April 1813
An Act for enlarging the Term and Powers of an Act of His present Majesty, (Note: Great Marlow to Stokenchurch Road Act 1791 (31 Geo. 3. c. 135)) for repairing the Road from Great Marlow, in the County of Buckingham to Stokenchurch, in the County of Oxford.
Castleford and Ferrybridge Road Closure Act 1813	53 Geo. 3. c. xlv	15 April 1813
An Act for shutting up a Road and Footpath, leading from Castleford to Ferrybridge, in the County of York.
Roads in Clackmannan and Perth Act 1813 (repealed)	53 Geo. 3. c. xlvi	15 April 1813
An Act to continue the Term and alter the Powers of several Acts of the Thirty fourth, (Note: Clackmannan and Perth Roads Act 1794 (34 Geo. 3. c. 139)) Thirty seventh (Note: Clackmannan and Perth Roads Act 1797 (37 Geo. 3. c. 166)) and Forty fifth (Note: Roads in Clackmannan and Perth Act 1805 (45 Geo. 3. c. xvi)) Years of His Majesty's Reign, for repairing several Roads in the Counties of Clackmannan and Perth. (Repealed by Clackmannan and Perth Roads Act 1840 (3 & 4 Vict. c. xl))
Lewes and Brighton Road Act 1813 (repealed)	53 Geo. 3. c. xlvii	15 April 1813
An Act for continuing and amending Two Acts of His present Majesty (Note: Lewes and Brighton Road Act 1770 (10 Geo. 3. c. 64)) (Note: Lewes and Brighton Road Act 1791 (31 Geo. 3. c. 115)) for repairing and widening the Road from Lewes to Brighthelmstone, (Note: Brighthelmstone is now known as Brighton.) in the County of Suffex. (Repealed by Lewes to Brighton Road Act 1833 (3 & 4 Will. 4. c. xliii))
Wakefield and Sheffield Road Act 1813 (repealed)	53 Geo. 3. c. xlviii	15 April 1813
An Act for enlarging the Term and Powers of Four several Acts, passed in the Thirty first Year of the Reign of His late Majesty King George the Second, (Note: Leeds and Wakefield Road Act 1757 (31 Geo. 2. c. 63)) and in the First, (Note: Leeds to Sheffield Road Act 1760 (1 Geo. 3. c. 33)) Eighteenth (Note: Wakefield to Sheffield Road Act 1778 (18 Geo. 3. c. 105)) and Thirty seventh (Note: Wakefield and Sheffield Road Act 1797 (37 Geo. 3. c. 159)) Years of the Reign of His present Majesty, for repairing the Road from Leeds to Sheffield, in the County of York, so far as the same relate to the Road from Wakefield to Sheffield, and for diverting a Part of the said Road. (Repealed by Wakefield and Sheffield Road Act 1830 (11 Geo. 4 & 1 Will. 4. c. xxii))
Prebendary of Cantlowes Leasing Act 1813	53 Geo. 3. c. xlix	15 April 1813
An Act for enabling the Prebendary of Cantlowes, in the Cathedral Church of Saint Paul in London, to grant a Lease, with Powers of Renewal, of the Prebendal Lands of Kentish Town, in the County of Middlesex.
Earl of Chesterfield's Estate Act 1813	53 Geo. 3. c. l	15 April 1813
An Act for vesting Part of the Settled Estates of the Right Honourable Philip Earl of Chesterfield, in Trustees, in Trust to be sold; and for laying out the Monies arising from such Sales, in the Purchase of other Estates, to be settled to the same Uses.
Earl of Albemarle's Estate Act 1813	53 Geo. 3. c. li	15 April 1813
An Act for vesting certain Estates of the Right Honourable William Charles Earl of Albemarle, at Elveden otherwise Elden, and Bardwell, in the County of Suffolk, devised by the Will of the Right Honourable Augustus Viscount Keppel, in Trustees, upon Trust to sell the same; and to apply the Money arising from the Sale thereof in the Purchase of Estates contiguous to the Family Estates of the said Earl in the County of Norfolk, to be settled to the subsisting Uses of the said Will of the said Augustus Viscount Keppel.
See of York Estates Act 1813	53 Geo. 3. c. lii	15 April 1813
An Act for vesting certain Estates belonging to the See of York, in Trustees for Sale, and for applying the Monies thence arising in the Purchase of other Estates, to be settled to the same Uses as the Estates sold.
Reade's Estate Act 1813	53 Geo. 3. c. liii	15 April 1813
An Act for vesting certain detached Settled Estates of Sir John Chandos Reade Baronet, in Trustees, to be sold, for paying off Incumbrances thereon, and for purchasing other Estates to be settled to the same Uses.
Stoneleigh Inclosure Act 1813	53 Geo. 3. c. liv	15 April 1813
An Act for inclosing Lands in the Parish of Stonleigh, in the County of Warwick.
Ashley Inclosure Act 1813	53 Geo. 3. c. lv	15 April 1813
An Act for inclosing Lands in the Parish of Ashley, in the County of Stafford.
Ecchinswell Inclosure Act 1813	53 Geo. 3. c. lvi	15 April 1813
An Act for inclosing Lands in Ecchinswell, in the County of Southampton.
Stow Bedon Inclosure Act 1813	53 Geo. 3. c. lvii	15 April 1813
An Act for inclosing Lands in the Parish of Stow Bedon, in the County of Norfolk.
Laughton Inclosure Act 1813	53 Geo. 3. c. lviii	15 April 1813
An Act for inclosing Lands in the Manor of Laughton, in the County of Sussex.
Hardingham Inclosure Act 1813	53 Geo. 3. c. lix	15 April 1813
An Act for inclosing Lands in the Parish of Hardingham, in the County of Norfolk.
Wraxall, Nailsea and Bourton Inclosures Act 1813	53 Geo. 3. c. lx	15 April 1813
An Act for inclosing Lands in Wraxall, Nailsea and Bourton, in the County of Somerset.
Skelton Inclosure Act 1813	53 Geo. 3. c. lxi	15 April 1813
An Act for inclosing Lands in the Manor of Skelton in Cleveland, in the County of York.
Marylebone Park Improvement Act 1813	53 Geo. 3. c. lxii	1 May 1813
An Act for paving and otherwise improving certain Streets and other Public Passages and Places which are or shall be made upon certain Pieces of Ground belonging to His Majesty, in the several Parishes of Saint Mary le bone and Saint Pancras, in the County of Middlesex, called Mary le bone Park.
Yoker Bridge and Dumbarton Road Act 1813	53 Geo. 3. c. lxiii	1 May 1813
An Act for altering, amending and enlarging the Powers of several Acts (Note: Glasgow Roads Act 1753 (26 Geo. 2. c. 90)) (Note: Glasgow Roads Act 1754 (27 Geo. 2. c. 27)) (Note: Glasgow and Dumbarton Roads Act 1772 (12 Geo. 3. c. 106)) (Note: Glasgow Roads Act 1788 (28 Geo. 3. c. 92)) for making and repairing certain Roads leading into the City of Glasgow, so far as they relate to that Part of the Road from the City of Glasgow to the Town of Dumbarton, which leads from Yoker Bridge to the Town of Dumbarton.
Ludlow-fach, Llandovery and River Amman Roads Act 1813 (repealed)	53 Geo. 3. c. lxiv	1 May 1813
An Act to continue the Term, and to continue, enlarge and amend the Powers of Two Acts of His present Majesty, (Note: Ludlow-fach, Llandovery and River Amman Roads Act 1779 (19 Geo. 3. c. 102)) (Note: Ludlow-fach, Llandovery and River Amman Roads Act 1795 (35 Geo. 3. c. 143)) for amending, widening and keeping in Repair the Roads leading from Ludlowfach to the Town of Llandovery; and from thence to the River Amman, in the County of Carmarthen, and several other Roads in the same County, communicating therewith; and for making several new Branches of Road to communicate with the said Roads. (Repealed by Ludlow-fach, Llandovery and River Amman Roads (Carmarthen and Glamorgan) Act 1831 (1 Will. 4. c. lix))
Road from Cullompton to Hazel Stone Act 1813 (repealed)	53 Geo. 3. c. lxv	1 May 1813
An Act for making and maintaining a Carriage Road from Padbrooke Bridge in the Parish of Cullompton, to Hazel Stone in the Parish of Broad Clift, in the County of Devon. (Repealed by Road from Padbrooke Bridge to Hazel-Stone (Devon) Act 1839 (2 & 3 Vict. c. xx))
Moira and Loudon Estates Act 1813	53 Geo. 3. c. lxvi	1 May 1813
An Act for exchanging Part of the settled Estates of the Right Honourable Francis Earl of Moira, situate in England, for Part of the Estates of the Right Honourable Flora Mure Countess of Loudoun, his Wife, situate in Scotland.
Long Ashton Inclosure Act 1813	53 Geo. 3. c. lxvii	1 May 1813
An Act for inclosing Lands in Long Ashton, in the County of Somerset.
Rampisham Inclosure Act 1813	53 Geo. 3. c. lxviii	1 May 1813
An Act for inclosing Lands within the Manor of Rampisham in the Parishes of Rampisham and West Chelborough, in the County of Dorset.
Flint Inclosure Act 1813	53 Geo. 3. c. lxix	1 May 1813
An Act for inclosing Lands in the Township of Flint, in the County of Flint.
Cork Butter Trade Act 1813	53 Geo. 3. c. lxx	21 May 1813
An Act for reviving, amending, and making perpetual, an Act passed in the Parliament of Ireland, in the Fortieth Year of the Reign of His present Majesty, (Note: City of Cork (Butter Market) Act 1800 (40 Geo. 3. c. 100 (I))) for the better Regulation of the Butter Trade of the City of Cork, and the Liberties thereof; and for other Purposes therein mentioned.
Covent Garden Market Act 1813 (repealed)	53 Geo. 3. c. lxxi	21 May 1813
An Act for regulating Covent Garden Market. (Repealed by Covent Garden Market Act 1828 (9 Geo. 4. c. cxiii))
Upper East Smithfield Improvement Act 1813 (repealed)	53 Geo. 3. c. lxxii	21 May 1813
An Act for enlarging the Powers of an Act of His present Majesty (Note: St. Botolph without Aldgate Improvement Act 1812 (52 Geo. 3. c. cxlix)) for widening and improving Upper East Smithfield, in the Parish of Saint Botolph without Aldgate, in the County of Middlesex. (Repealed by London Government (Borough of Stepney) Order in Council 1901 (SR&O 1901/276))
Plymouth Workhouse Act 1813 (repealed)	53 Geo. 3. c. lxxiii	21 May 1813
An Act for altering and amending Three Acts of the Sixth Year of Queen Anne, (Note: Plymouth Workhouse Act 1707 (6 Ann. c. 46)) the Thirty second Year of King George the Second, (Note: Plymouth (Poor Relief) Act 1758 (32 Geo. 2. c. 39)) and the Twenty sixth Year of His present Majesty, (Note: Plymouth (Poor Relief) Act 1786 (26 Geo. 3. c. 19)) for erecting a Workhouse in the Town and Borough of Plymouth, in the County of Devon, and for setting the Poor on Work, and maintaining them there. (Repealed by Statute Law (Repeals) Act 2008 (c. 12))
Ardglass Harbour Roads Act 1813	53 Geo. 3. c. lxxiv	21 May 1813
An Act for enabling William Ogilvie Esquire, to purchase Lands for opening sufficient Roads to and Communications with the Harbour of Ardglass, in the County of Down.
Monkland Navigation Act 1813	53 Geo. 3. c. lxxv	21 May 1813
An Act for amending an Act of the Tenth Year of His present Majesty, (Note: Monkland Canal Act 1770 (10 Geo. 3. c. 105)) for making and maintaining a Navigable Cut or Canal, and Waggon Way, from the Collieries in the Parishes of Old and New Monkland, to the City of Glasgow.
Royal College of Surgeons (Edinburgh) Widows' Fund Act 1813 (repealed)	53 Geo. 3. c. lxxvi	21 May 1813
An Act for altering and amending an Act made in the Twenty seventh Year of His present Majesty, (Note: Edinburgh College of Surgeons Act 1787 (27 Geo. 3. c. 65)) for confirming a Charter or Letters Patent granted by His Majesty to the Royal College and Corporation of Surgeons of the City of Edinburgh, and for establishing a Fund for a Provision to the Widows and Children of the Members of the said Corporation and their Clerk. (Repealed by Royal College of Surgeons of Edinburgh (Widows Fund) Act 1860 (23 & 24 Vict. c. clxxvi))
Edinburgh Gaol Act 1813	53 Geo. 3. c. lxxvii	21 May 1813
An Act for erecting and maintaining a new Gaol, and other Buildings, for the County and City of Edinburgh.
Oxford County Rate Act 1813 (repealed)	53 Geo. 3. c. lxxviii	21 May 1813
An Act for making an equal County Rate for the County of Oxford. (Repealed by Oxfordshire Act 1985 (c. xxxiv))
Surrey and Kent Sewers Act 1813	53 Geo. 3. c. lxxix	21 May 1813
An Act for amending, enlarging and extending the Powers of Two several Acts passed in the Forty ninth (Note: Surrey and Kent Sewers Act 1809 (49 Geo. 3. c. clxxxiii)) and Fiftieth (Note: Surrey and Kent Sewers Act 1810 (50 Geo. 3. c. cxliv)) Years of His present Majesty, relating to the Execution of the Commission of Sewers for the Limits extending from East Mouldsey in Surry, to Ravensborne in Kent.
Ellesmere and Chester Canals Unification Act 1813 (repealed)	53 Geo. 3. c. lxxx	21 May 1813
An Act for uniting the Interests and Concerns of the Proprietors of the Chester Canal and Ellesmere Canal; and for amending the several Acts of His present Majesty, (Note: Chester Canal Act 1772 (12 Geo. 3. c. 75)) (Note: Chester Canal Act 1777 (17 Geo. 3. c. 67)) (Note: Chester Canal Act 1778 (18 Geo. 3. c. 21)) (Note: Ellesmere and Chester Canal Act 1793 (33 Geo. 3. c. 91)) (Note: Ellesmere and Chester Canal Act 1796 (36 Geo. 3. c. 71)) (Note: Ellesmere and Chester Canal (No. 2) Act 1796 (36 Geo. 3. c. 96)) (Note: Ellesmere and Chester Canal Act 1801 (41 Geo. 3. (U.K.) c. lxx)) (Note: Ellesmere Canal (Whitchurch Extension) Act 1810 (50 Geo. 3. c. xxiv)) relating to the said Canals. (Repealed by Ellesmere and Chester Canal Act 1827 (7 & 8 Geo. 4. c. cii))
Waterbeach Level Drainage Act 1813	53 Geo. 3. c. lxxxi	21 May 1813
An Act for enlarging the Powers of an Act of King George the Second, (Note: Waterbeach Level Drainage Act 1740 (14 Geo. 2. c. 24)) and an Act of His present Majesty, (Note: Waterbeach Level Drainage Act 1797 (37 Geo. 3. c. 88)) for Draining Lands in Waterbeach Level, in the County of Cambridge.
Margate Improvement Act 1813 (repealed)	53 Geo. 3. c. lxxxii	21 May 1813
An Act for more effectually paving, lighting, watching and improving the Town of Margate, in the County of Kent. (Repealed by County of Kent Act 1981 (c. xviii))
Kidderminster Improvement Act 1813 (repealed)	53 Geo. 3. c. lxxxiii	21 May 1813
An Act for paving, cleansing, lighting watching and otherwise improving the Streets and other public Passages and Places in Kidderminster, in the County of Worcester. (Repealed by Local Government Supplemental Act 1870 (33 & 34 Vict. c. cxiv))
Poplar and Blackwell Improvement Act 1813 (repealed)	53 Geo. 3. c. lxxxiv	21 May 1813
An Act for paving, lighting, watching and improving the Hamlet of Poplar and Blackwall, in the County of Middlesex; and for the better Relief and Maintenance of the Poor of the said Hamlet. (Repealed by London Government (Borough of Poplar) Order in Council 1901 (SR&O 1901/220))
St. Mary Abbotts Kensington Burial Ground Act 1813	53 Geo. 3. c. lxxxv	21 May 1813
An Act for providing additional Burying Ground for the Parish of Saint Mary Abbotts Kensington, in the County of Middlesex.
Clapham Chapel of Ease Act 1813 (repealed)	53 Geo. 3. c. lxxxvi	21 May 1813
An Act for building a Chapel of Ease for the Parish of Clapham, in the County of Surry. (Repealed by London Government (Borough of Wandsworth) Order in Council 1901 (SR&O 1901/222))
Southwark Bridge Act 1813	53 Geo. 3. c. lxxxvii	21 May 1813
An Act to amend an Act, passed in the Fifty first Year of His present Majesty, (Note: Southwark Bridge Act 1811 (51 Geo. 3. c. clxvi)) for erecting a Bridge over the River Thames, from the City of London to the opposite Bank in the Parish of Saint Saviour, in the County of Surry.
Kirkcaldy Two Pennies Scots Act 1813 (repealed)	53 Geo. 3. c. lxxxviii	21 May 1813
An Act to continue Three Acts made in the Fifteenth (Note: Kirkcaldy Beer Duties Act 1741 (15 Geo. 2. c. 8)) and Thirty first (Note: Kirkcaldy Beer Duties Act 1757 (31 Geo. 2. c. 69)) Years of the Reign of His late Majesty King George the Second; and in the Thirty first Year of the Reign of His present Majesty, (Note: Kirkcaldy Beer Duties Act 1791 (31 Geo. 3. c. 82)) laying a Duty of Two Pennies Scots, or One sixth Part of a Penny Sterling, upon every Scots Pint of Ale and Beer, which shall be brewed for Sale, brought into, tapped or sold within the Town of Kirkcaldy and Liberties thereof. (Repealed by Kirkcaldy Corporation Order Confirmation Act 1939 (2 & 3 Geo. 6. c. vi))
Road from Peterborough to Thorney Act 1813	53 Geo. 3. c. lxxxix	21 May 1813
An Act for enlarging the Term and Powers of an Act of His present Majesty, (Note: Cambridge Roads Act 1792 (32 Geo. 3. c. 129)) for repairing the Road from Peterborough to Thorney, in the Isle of Ely, in the County of Cambridge.
Highways from Kensington Act 1813 (repealed)	53 Geo. 3. c. xc	21 May 1813
An Act to alter and enlarge the Powers of Three Acts of His present Majesty (Note: Middlesex Roads Act 1766 (7 Geo. 3. c. 88)) (Note: Brentford Road Act 1791 (31 Geo. 3. c. 124)) (Note: Middlesex Roads Act 1795 (35 Geo. 3. c. 134)) for repairing the Highways from that Part of Counter's Bridge which lies in the Parish of Kensington, in the County of Middlesex leading through the Towns of Brentford and Hounslow, to the Powder Mills in the Road to Staines, and to Cranford Bridge, in the Road to Colnbrook, and several other Roads in the said County, so far as the same relate to the New District of Road therein described. (Repealed by Metropolis Roads Act 1826 (7 Geo. 4. c. cxlii))
Roads from Cornhill Burn Act 1813 (repealed)	53 Geo. 3. c. xci	21 May 1813
An Act to continue the Term and enlarge the Powers of an Act of His present Majesty, (Note: Northumberland and Durham Roads Act 1792 (32 Geo. 3. c. 145)) for repairing the Road from Cornhill Burn to Milfield March Burn, and by Ford Bridge to Lowick, and other Roads in the said Act mentioned, in the Counties of Northumberland and Durham; and for making Two new Branches of Road to communicate therewith. (Repealed by Ford and Lowick Turnpikes Act 1835 (5 & 6 Will. 4. c. xxvii))
Isle of Wight Highway Act 1813 or the Isle of Wight Roads Act 1813 (repealed)	53 Geo. 3. c. xcii	21 May 1813
An Act for amending the Roads and Highways in the Isle of Wight. (Repealed by Isle of Wight Highways Act 1925 (15 & 16 Geo. 5. c. xiii))
Hitchin and Bedford Roads and Branches Act 1813 (repealed)	53 Geo. 3. c. xciii	21 May 1813
An Act for continuing and amending Three Acts of His late and present Majesty, (Note: Hertford and Bedford Roads Act 1757 (30 Geo. 2. c. 43)) (Note: Hertford and Bedford Roads (No. 2) Act 1769 (9 Geo. 3. c. 87)) (Note: Hertford and Bedford Roads Act 1790 (30 Geo. 3. c. 115)) for repairing the Road from Hitchin to Bedford, and the Roads branching therefrom, through Henlow to Gerford Bridge and to Arlesey, in the Counties of Hertford and Bedford. (Repealed by Hitchin, Shefford, Henlow and Gorford Bridge Roads Act 1835 (5 & 6 Will. 4. c. xxxix))
Stumpcross and Newmarket Heath Road Act 1813 (repealed)	53 Geo. 3. c. xciv	21 May 1813
An Act for enlarging the Term and Powers of an Act of His present Majesty, for more effectually repairing the Road from Stump Cross to Newmarket Heath, and other Roads therein mentioned, in the County of Cambridge; and for empowering the Trustees to erect a Weighing Engine near to the said Road. (Repealed by Stumpcross Roads Act 1841 (4 & 5 Vict. c. xx))
Road from Downham Market Act 1813 (repealed)	53 Geo. 3. c. xcv	21 May 1813
An Act for enlarging the Term and Powers of Two Acts of His present Majesty, (Note: Norfolk Roads Act 1772 (12 Geo. 3. c. 98)) (Note: Norfolk Roads Act 1792 (32 Geo. 3. c. 158)) for repairing the Road from Downham Market to the Queen's Head, and from the Checquer Inn in Downham Market to the Two Mile Close, in the Parish of Barton, in the County of Norfolk. (Repealed by Downham Market, Barton and Devil's Ditch Road Act 1832 (2 & 3 Will. 4. c. xxi))
Steeple Ashton Inclosure Act 1813	53 Geo. 3. c. xcvi	21 May 1813
An Act for inclosing Lands in the Parish of Steeple Ashton, in the County of Wilts.
Riddell's Estate Act 1813	53 Geo. 3. c. xcvii	21 May 1813
An Act for vesting Part of the Estates, settled by the Will of Thomas Riddell Esquire, deceased, in Trustees, to be sold; and for applying the Money by such Sale arising, in the Discharge of Incumbrances affecting the same; and for investing the Residue of such Money in the Purchase of other Estates in the County of Northumberland, to be settled to the same Uses.
Brasenose College Oxford and Shaw's Estate Act 1813	53 Geo. 3. c. xcviii	21 May 1813
An Act for enabling the Principal and Scholars of Brazen Nose College, Oxford, to sell the Manor and Farm of Gennings Court, Kent, to Sir John Gregory Shaw, Baronet, and to apply the Money thence arising in the Purchase of other Estates, to be settled to the same Uses.
Holden's Estate Act 1813	53 Geo. 3. c. xcix	21 May 1813
An Act for vesting the Settled Estates of Robert Holden Esquire, situate in the County of York, and Normanton in the County of Nottingham, in Trust to be sold, and for laying out the Purchase Money in other Estates, to be settled to the same Uses.
Barker's Estate Act 1813	53 Geo. 3. c. c	21 May 1813
An Act for vesting certain Estates in the County of Westmorland in James Adam Esquire, discharged of the Uses of the Will of the Reverend James Barker, deceased; and for settling other Estates in lieu thereof; and for other Purposes.
Thurgoland Inclosure Act 1813	53 Geo. 3. c. ci	21 May 1813
An Act for inclosing Lands in the Manor of Thurgoland, in the County of York.
Uphill Inclosure Act 1813	53 Geo. 3. c. cii	21 May 1813
An Act for inclosing Lands in the Parish of Uphill, in the County of Somerset.
Buckden Inclosure Act 1813	53 Geo. 3. c. ciii	21 May 1813
An Act for inclosing Lands in the Parish of Buckden, in the County of Huntington.
Wike Inclosure Act 1813	53 Geo. 3. c. civ	21 May 1813
An Act for inclosing Lands in the Manor and Township of Wike, in the County of York.
Shap Inclosure Act 1813	53 Geo. 3. c. cv	21 May 1813
An Act for repealing an Act passed in the Seventh Year of the Reign of His present Majesty, intituled "An Act for dividing and inclosing the Open Commons in the Manor of Shap, in the County of Westmorland;" (Note: Shap Inclosure Act 1767 (7 Geo. 3. c. 88 Pr.)) and for granting other Powers for dividing, allotting and inclosing the said Lands and Grounds.
Stukeley Inclosure Act 1813	53 Geo. 3. c. cvi	21 May 1813
An Act for inclosing, and exonerating from Tithes, Lands in the Parish of Stukeley, in the County of Huntingdon
Waterbeach Inclosure Act 1813	53 Geo. 3. c. cvii	21 May 1813
An Act for inclosing Lands in the Parish of Waterbeach, in the County of Cambridge
Elvetham Inclosure Act 1813	53 Geo. 3. c. cviii	21 May 1813
An Act for inclosing Lands in the Parish of Elvetham, in the County of Southampton
Whittington and Newton with Docker Inclosures Act 1813	53 Geo. 3. c. cix	21 May 1813
An Act for inclosing Lands within the Townships of Whittington and Newton with Docker, in the Parish of Whittington, in the County Palatine of Lancaster.
Swedish Government Compensation Distribution Act 1813	53 Geo. 3. c. cx	3 June 1813
An Act to provide for the Distribution, Payment and Application of certain Monies and Effects, refunded or paid, or to be refunded or paid, by or on Behalf of the Government of Sweden, among the Persons having Claims thereon in consequence of certain Detentions, Sequestrations and Condemnations by that Government, in the Years One thousand eight hundred and ten, One thousand eight hundred and eleven, and One thousand eight hundred and twelve.
Cork City and County Rates Act 1813	53 Geo. 3. c. cxi	3 June 1813
An Act for the more equal Assessment of Money presented to be raised by the Grand Jury of the County of the City of Cork; and for a new Valuation of the said City and Survey of the Liberties thereof; and for other Purposes relative to Grand Juries.
St. Leonard Shoreditch Improvement Act 1813	53 Geo. 3. c. cxii	3 June 1813
An Act for the better Relief and Employment of the Poor; and for the Enlargement of the Burial Grounds in the Parish of Saint Leonard Shoreditch, in the County of Middlesex; and for other Purposes relating to the said Parish.
Bethnal Green Improvement Act 1813 (repealed)	53 Geo. 3. c. cxiii	3 June 1813
An Act for the better Relief and Maintenance of the Poor; and for making a more adequate Provision for the Rector, of the Parish of Saint Matthew, Bethnal Green, in the County of Middlesex; and for more effectually lighting, watching, cleansing and improving the Streets and other public Places of and within the said Parish. (Repealed by London Government (Borough of Southwark) Order in Council 1901 (SR&O 1901/275))
St. George's Church, Everton Act 1813	53 Geo. 3. c. cxiv	3 June 1813
An Act for erecting a Church in the Township of Everton, in the Parish of Walton on the Hill, in the County of Lancaster.
Hanley Market Act 1813 (repealed)	53 Geo. 3. c. cxv	3 June 1813
An Act for establishing and regulating the Market, and for enlarging and improving the Market Place at Hanley, in the County of Stafford. (Repealed by Local Government Board's Provisional Order Confirmation (No. 3) Act 1908 (8 Edw. 7. c. clxiv))
King's Bench, Marshalsea and Fleet Prisons (Relief of Poor Prisoners) Act 1813 (repealed)	53 Geo. 3. c. cxvi	3 June 1813
An Act to amend an Act, passed in the Fifty second Year of His present Majesty, intituled "An Act to enable Justices of the Peace to order Parochial Relief to Prisoners confined under Mesne Process for Debt, in such Gaols as are not County Gaols," (Note: Relief of Debtors in Prison Act 1812 (52 Geo. 3. c. 160)) so far as regards the Parish of Saint George the Martyr, in the Borough of Southwark, in the County of Surry and the Parish of Saint Bridget otherwise Saint Bride, in the City of London. (Repealed by Statute Law (Repeals) Act 2008 (c. 12))
Perth Gaol Act 1813	53 Geo. 3. c. cxvii	3 June 1813
An Act for erecting and maintaining a new Gaol for the County and City of Perth; and for other Purposes relating thereto.
Warrington Improvement and Bridewell Act 1813 (repealed)	53 Geo. 3. c. cxviii	3 June 1813
An Act for paving and improving the Town of Warrington, in the County of Lancaster; and for building a New Bridewell in the said Town. (Repealed by Warrington Improvement and Market Act 1854 (17 & 18 Vict. c. viii))
Kennet and Avon Canal Company and River Kennet Navigation Act 1813 or the Kennet Navigation Act 1813	53 Geo. 3. c. cxix	3 June 1813
An Act to enable the Kennet and Avon Canal Company to raise a further Sum of Money to purchase the Shares of the River Kennet Navigation; and to amend the several Acts passed for making the said Canal.
Wilts and Berks Canal Navigation Act 1813 (repealed)	53 Geo. 3. c. cxx	3 June 1813
An Act for explaining and amending an Act of His present Majesty, (Note: Wilts and Berks Canal Act 1795 (35 Geo. 3. c. 52)) for making a Navigable Canal from the River Thames or Isis, near Abingdon in the County of Berks, to join the Kennet and Avon Canal, near Trowbridge in the County of Wilts; and certain Navigable Cuts. (Repealed by Wilts and Berks Canal Navigation Act 1821 (1 & 2 Geo. 4. c. xcvii))
Abergele, St. Asaph, Rhydlan, Diserth and Meliden Drainage and Inclosures Act 1813	53 Geo. 3. c. cxxi	3 June 1813
An Act to enlarge the Powers of an Act of His present Majesty, (Note: Abergele and Rhydlan Drainage Act 1794 (34 Geo. 3. c. 110)) for embanking, draining and inclosing Lands in the Parishes of Abergele, Saint Asaph, Rhydlan, Diserth and Meliden, and the Franchise of Rhydlan, in the Counties of Denbigh and Flint.
Liverpool Water Act 1813 (repealed)	53 Geo. 3. c. cxxii	3 June 1813
An Act for enlarging the Powers of Two Acts of His present Majesty, (Note: Liverpool Water Supply Act 1799 (39 Geo. 3. c. xxxvi)) (Note: Liverpool Water Act 1810 (50 Geo. 3. c. clxv)) for better supplying the Town and Port of Liverpool with Water. (Repealed by Liverpool Corporation Act 1921 (11 & 12 Geo. 5. c. lxxiv))
Wexford (Slaney) Bridge Act 1813	53 Geo. 3. c. cxxiii	3 June 1813
An Act to amend an Act made in the Thirty fourth Year of His present Majesty, (Note: Town of Wexford (Improvement) Act 1794 (34 Geo. 3. c. 26 (I))) for building a Bridge over the River Slaney at Wexford.
Ferry Carrig (Slaney) Bridge Act 1813	53 Geo. 3. c. cxxiv	3 June 1813
An Act to amend an Act made in the Thirty fourth Year of His present Majesty, for building a Bridge over the River Slaney, at Ferry Carrig, in the County of Wexford.
Firth of Forth Bridges Act 1813	53 Geo. 3. c. cxxv	3 June 1813
An Act for further improving the Communication between the County of Edinburgh and the County of Fife, by the Ferries cross the Frith of Forth, between Leith and Newhaven, in the County of Edinburgh, and Kinghorn and Bruntisland in the County of Fife.
Edinburgh Bakers' Widows' Fund Act 1813	53 Geo. 3. c. cxxvi	3 June 1813
An Act for providing a Fund for Annuities for Widows of Members of the Incorporation of Bakers of the City of Edinburgh.
Colneis and Carlford Poor Relief Act 1813 (repealed)	53 Geo. 3. c. cxxvii	3 June 1813
An Act for amending an Act of His present Majesty, (Note: Colneis and Carlford Hundreds, Suffolk Poor Relief Act 1790 (30 Geo. 3. c. 22)) for the better Relief and Employment of the Poor, within the Hundreds of Colneis and Carlford, in the County of Suffolk. (Repealed by Statute Law (Repeals) Act 2013 (c. 2))
Road to Studley Bridge Act 1813	53 Geo. 3. c. cxxviii	3 June 1813
An Act for enlarging the Term and Powers of Two Acts of His present Majesty, (Note: Wilts Roads Act 1773 (13 Geo. 3. c. 101)) (Note: Wiltshire Roads Act 1792 (32 Geo. 3. c. 114)) for repairing the Road from Cherrill, through Calne, to Studley Bridge, and other Roads therein mentioned, in the County of Wilts.
Road from Durham to Tyne Bridge Act 1813 (repealed)	53 Geo. 3. c. cxxix	3 June 1813
An Act for continuing and amending Three Acts, (Note: Durham to Tyne Bridge Road Act 1746 (20 Geo. 2. c. 12)) (Note: Durham and Tyne Bridge Road Act 1753 (26 Geo. 2. c. 48)) (Note: Durham Roads Act 1773 (13 Geo. 3. c. 99)) for repairing the Road from the City of Durham to Tyne Bridge, in the County of Durham. (Repealed by Road from Durham to Tyne Bridge Act 1824 (5 Geo. 4. c. cii))
Norwich and Great Yarmouth Road Act 1813 (repealed)	53 Geo. 3. c. cxxx	3 June 1813
An Act to continue and amend Two Acts of the Ninth (Note: Norwich to Yarmouth Road Act 1769 (9 Geo. 3. c. 68)) and Thirtieth (Note: Norwich to Yarmouth Road Act 1790 (30 Geo. 3. c. 86)) Years of His present Majesty, for amending the Road from Bishopsgate Bridge, in the City of Norwich, to a Stone formerly called the Two Mile Stone, where the Norwich Road joins the Caister Causeway, Two Miles and a Half short of the Town of Great Yarmouth. (Repealed by Road from Norwich to the Caister Causeway Act 1831 (1 Will. 4. c. lxv))
Warrington and Wigan Road Act 1813 (repealed)	53 Geo. 3. c. cxxxi	3 June 1813
An Act for amending the Road from Earl's Kill, in Warrington, to the Toll Bars in Wallgate, in Wigan, in the County of Lancaster. (Repealed by Warrington and Wigan Road (Lancashire) Act 1833 (3 & 4 Will. 4. c. lxxiv))
Shrewsbury to Wrexham Road Act 1813	53 Geo. 3. c. cxxxii	3 June 1813
An Act for enlarging the Term and Powers of an Act of King George the Second, (Note: Shrewsbury and Wrexham Road Act 1756 (29 Geo. 2. c. 93)) and an Act of His present Majesty, (Note: Denbigh Roads Act 1788 (28 Geo. 3. c. 112)) for repairing the Road from Shrewsbury to Wrexham, and several other Roads in the Counties of Denbigh, Chester, and Flint, so far as relates to the Road in the County of Flint, called The Mold District.
Road from Neat Enstone and Chipping Norton Turnpike Road to Weston-on-the-Green (Oxfordshire) Act 1813 (repealed)	53 Geo. 3. c. cxxxiii	3 June 1813
An Act for enlarging the Term and Powers of an Act of His present Majesty, (Note: Bicester Roads Act 1793 (33 Geo. 3. c. 180)) for repairing the Road from the Neat Enstone and Chipping Norton Turnpike Road, through Bicester to Weston on the Green, in the County of Oxford, and for making a new Branch of Road to communicate therewith. (Repealed by Statute Law (Repeals) Act 2013 (c. 2))
Rochdale and Edenfield Road Act 1813 (repealed)	53 Geo. 3. c. cxxxiv	3 June 1813
An Act for continuing the Term and enlarging the Powers of an Act passed in the Thirty fourth Year of the Reign of His present Majesty, (Note: Rochdale to Bury Road Act 1794 (34 Geo. 3. c. 124)) for amending and improving the Road leading from the Town of Rochdale, to a Place called Edenfield, in the Parish of Bury, in the County of Lancaster. (Repealed by Rochdale and Edenfield Road Act 1833 (3 & 4 Will. 4. c. lxxxiv))
Road from Shelton to Blakeley Lane Head and from Bucknall to Weston Coyney Act 1813	53 Geo. 3. c. cxxxv	3 June 1813
An Act for continuing and amending Two Acts of His present Majesty, (Note: Staffordshire Roads (No. 2) Act 1771 (11 Geo. 3. c. 87)) (Note: Stafford Roads (No. 2) Act 1792 (32 Geo. 3. c. 160)) for repairing the Road from Shelton to Blakely Lane Head and from Bucknall to Weston Coyney, in the County of Stafford; and also for altering and repairing the Road from Adderley Green to Lane End, in the same County.
Roads, Bridges and Statute Labour in Ross and Cromarty Act 1813	53 Geo. 3. c. cxxxvi	3 June 1813
An Act to amend and enlarge the Powers of an Act passed in the Forty fifth Year of His present Majesty, (Note: Roads and Bridges in Ross, Cromarty and Nairn Act 1805 (45 Geo. 3. c. xl)) for assessing the Proprietors of Lands in the County of Ross, towards the Expence of making and supporting certain Roads and Bridges therein; and of an Act passed in the Forty seventh Year of His present Majesty, (Note: Statute Labour, Roads and Bridges in Ross, Cromarty and Nairn Act 1807 (47 Geo. 3 Sess. 1. c. xiii)) for regulating and converting the Statute Labour in the Counties of Ross and Cromarty, and Part of the County of Nairn, locally situated in the County of Ross; and of an Act passed in the Fiftieth Year of His present Majesty, (Note: Roads, Bridges and Statute Labour in Ross, Cromarty and Nairn Act 1810 (50 Geo. 3. c. clxxxix)) for amending and enlarging the Powers of the Two first mentioned Acts.
Roads from Maidenhead Bridge (Third District) Act 1813 (repealed)	53 Geo. 3. c. cxxxvii	3 June 1813
An Act for enlarging the Powers of an Act of His present Majesty, (Note: Roads from Maidenhead Bridge to Reading and to Henley Bridge Act 1806 (46 Geo. 3. c. cxlv)) for repairing the Roads from Maidenhead Bridge to Reading, and from the said Bridge to Henley Bridge (Note: Henley Bridge in Henley-on-Thames. 51°32′15″N 0°54′01″W) in the County of Berks, so far as relates to the Third District of the said Roads. (Repealed by Henley Bridge and Bisham Road Act 1826 (7 Geo. 4. c. lxxvii))
Lloyd's Estate Act 1813	53 Geo. 3. c. cxxxviii	3 June 1813
An Act for vesting certain Estates devised by the Will of Sir Edward Lloyd Baronet, deceased, in Trustees to be sold, and for laying out the Money to arise by such Sale in the Purchase of other Estates, to be settled under the Direction of the Court of Chancery to the same Uses.
Worcester Bishopric and Dean and Chapter Estates Act 1813	53 Geo. 3. c. cxxxix	3 June 1813
An Act for effectuating an Exchange of Lands belonging to the Bishoprick of Worcester for Lands belonging to the Dean and Chapter of Worcester, in the County of Worcester.
Partridge's Estate Act 1813	53 Geo. 3. c. cxl	3 June 1813
An Act for effecting the Sale of certain Parts of the Estates devised by the Will of Henry Partridge Esquire, deceased; and for laying out the Money arising by such Sales, together with the clear Money produced by the Sale of certain other Parts of the said Estates, directed to be sold by an Act passed in the Forty ninth Year of the Reign of His present Majesty, (Note: Partridge's Estate Act 1809 (49 Geo. 3. c. clxxvii)) in the Purchase of other Estates, and for settling the same to the like Uses.
Dundraw Inclosure Act 1813	53 Geo. 3. c. cxli	3 June 1813
An Act for inclosing Lands in Dundraw, in the County of Cumberland.
Feltwell Inclosure Act 1813	53 Geo. 3. c. cxlii	3 June 1813
An Act for inclosing Lands in the Township of Feltwell, in the County of Norfolk.
Clirow Inclosure Act 1813	53 Geo. 3. c. cxliii	3 June 1813
An Act for inclosing Lands in the Parish of Clirow, in the County of Radnor, and extinguishing Vicarial Tithes in the said Parish.
Turweston Inclosure Act 1813	53 Geo. 3. c. cxliv	3 June 1813
An Act for inclosing Lands in the Manor and Parish of Turweston, in the County of Buckingham.
Whitwell Inclosure Act 1813	53 Geo. 3. c. cxlv	3 June 1813
An Act for inclosing Lands in the Parish of Whitwell, in the County of Derby.
Whitney Inclosure Act 1813	53 Geo. 3. c. cxlvi	3 June 1813
An Act for inclosing Lands in the Manor and Parish of Whitney, in the County of Hereford.
Stockton Inclosure Act 1813	53 Geo. 3. c. cxlvii	3 June 1813
An Act for inclosing Lands in the Township of Stockton, in the County of York.
Downton Inclosure Act 1813	53 Geo. 3. c. cxlviii	3 June 1813
An Act for inclosing Lands in the Parish of Downton, in the County of Wilts.
Llandyrnog and Llangwyfan Inclosures Act 1813	53 Geo. 3. c. cxlix	3 June 1813
An Act for inclosing Lands in Llandyrnog and Llangwyfan, in the County of Denbigh.
Cascob, Ednol and Kinnerton Inclosures Act 1813	53 Geo. 3. c. cl	3 June 1813
An Act for inclosing Lands in the Parish of Cascob, and Townships of Ednol and Kinnerton, in the County of Radnor.
Aughton Inclosure Act 1813	53 Geo. 3. c. cli	3 June 1813
An Act for inclosing Lands in the Township of Aughton in the Parish of Aughton, in the County Palatine of Lancaster.
Milborne Port Inclosure Act 1813	53 Geo. 3. c. clii	3 June 1813
An Act for amending an Act of His present Majesty (Note: Milborne Port Inclosure Act 1812 (52 Geo. 3. c. 16 Pr.)) for inclosing Lands in the Parish of Milborne Port, in the County of Somerset; and for transferring Borough Rights from certain Lands in the same Parish to other Lands therein, the better to effectuate such Inclosure.
Kirkburton Inclosure Act 1813	53 Geo. 3. c. cliii	3 June 1813
An Act for inclosing Lands in the Manor and Township of Kirkburton, in the County of York.
Spalford and Wigsley Inclosures Act 1813	53 Geo. 3. c. cliv	3 June 1813
An Act for inclosing Lands in the Township of Spalford and Wigsley, in the County of Nottingham.
South London Water Works Act 1813 (repealed)	53 Geo. 3. c. clv	22 June 1813
An Act to enable the Company of Proprietors of the South London Water Works to raise a further Sum of Money, and to alter and amend the Powers of an Act passed in the Forty fifth Year of His present Majesty, (Note: South London Waterworks Act 1805 (45 Geo. 3. c. cxix)) for making the said Water Works. (Repealed by Southwark and Vauxhall Water Company Act 1845 (8 & 9 Vict. c. lxix))
Liverpool Improvement Act 1813 (repealed)	53 Geo. 3. c. clvi	22 June 1813
An Act to authorize the Advancement of a certain Sum of Money for carrying into Effect the several Acts (Note: Liverpool Docks Act 1709 (8 Ann. c. 8)) (Note: Liverpool Docks Act 1716 (3 Geo. 1. c. 1 Pr.)) (Note: Liverpool Dock Act 1737 (11 Geo. 2. c. 32)) (Note: Liverpool Harbour Act 1762 (2 Geo. 3. c. 86)) (Note: Liverpool Harbour Act 1785 (25 Geo. 3. c. 15)) (Note: Liverpool Harbour Act 1799 (39 Geo. 3. c. lix)) (Note: Liverpool Port and Town Improvement Act 1811 (51 Geo. 3. c. cxliii)) for the Improvement of the Port and Town of Liverpool, and to amend the said Acts. (Repealed by Mersey Dock Acts Consolidation Act 1858 (21 & 22 Vict. c. xcii))
Aberdeen Harbour Act 1813 (repealed)	53 Geo. 3. c. clvii	22 June 1813
An Act for further improving the Harbour of Aberdeen. (Repealed by Aberdeen Harbour Act 1829 (10 Geo. 4. c. xxxiv))
Wexford Harbour Act 1813	53 Geo. 3. c. clviii	22 June 1813
An Act for the further Improvement of the Harbour of Wexford.
North Kelsey Drainage and Inclosure Act 1813	53 Geo. 3. c. clix	22 June 1813
An Act for inclosing, draining and exonerating from Tithes, Lands in the Lordship of North Kelsey, in the County of Lincoln.
Everton, Scaftworth, Gringeley-on-the-Hill, Misterton and Walkeringham Drainage Act 1813 (repealed)	53 Geo. 3. c. clx	22 June 1813
An Act for enlarging the Powers of Two Acts (Note: Everton, etc. (Nottinghamshire) Drainage, etc. Act 1796 (36 Geo. 3. c. 99)) (Note: Everton, Scaftworth, Gringley-on-the-Hill, Misterton and Walkeringham Drainage Act 1801 (41 Geo. 3. (U.K.) c. cxxxvi)) of His present Majesty, for embanking and draining certain Low Lands and Grounds in the Parishes or Townships of Everton, Scaftworth, Gringley on the Hill, Misterton and Walkeringham, in the County of Nottingham. (Repealed by Everton, &c. Drainage Act 1860 (23 & 24 Vict. c. cliv))
Hatfield Chase Drainage Act 1813	53 Geo. 3. c. clxi	22 June 1813
An Act for the more effectually draining and improving Lands within the Level of Hatfield Chace, and Parts adjacent, in the Counties of York, Lincoln and Nottingham.
St. Giles Camberwell Parochial Rates, Workhouse, Cemetery, &c. Act 1813 (repealed)	53 Geo. 3. c. clxii	22 June 1813
An Act for better assessing and collecting the Poor and other Rates, in the Parish of Saint Giles Camberwell, in the County of Surry, and regulating the Affairs thereof; for repairing or rebuilding the Parish Workhouse, and purchasing Ground for a Cemetry; and for other Purposes relating thereto. (Repealed by London Government (Borough of Camberwell) Order in Council 1901 (SR&O 1901/213))
St. Marylebone Improvement Act 1813 (repealed)	53 Geo. 3. c. clxiii	22 June 1813
An Act for altering and amending Two several Acts of the Thirty fifth (Note: Saint Marylebone Improvement Act 1795 (35 Geo. 3. c. 73)) and Forty sixth (Note: St. Marylebone Improvement Act 1806 (46 Geo. 3. c. xc)) Years of the Reign of His present Majesty, for paving and improving the Parish of Saint Mary le Bone, in the County of Middlesex. (Repealed by London Government (Borough of St. Marylebone) Order in Council 1901 (SR&O 1901/272))
Chepping Wycombe Improvement Act 1813 (repealed)	53 Geo. 3. c. clxiv	22 June 1813
An Act for paving, widening, cleansing, watching lighting and regulating the Streets and other Public Places within the Borough of Chepping Wycombe, in the County of Bucks, and for removing and preventing Nuisances and Obstructions therein. (Repealed by Chepping Wycombe Improvement Act 1874 (37 & 38 Vict. c. cxxi))
Road to Kilburn Bridge, and Road from Islington to the Edgware Road Act 1813	53 Geo. 3. c. clxv	22 June 1813
An Act for altering and amending several Acts (Note: Marylebone Road Act 1720 (7 Geo. 1. St. 1. c. 26)) (Note: Marylebone Road Act 1734 (8 Geo. 2. c. 8)) (Note: Highgate and Hampstead Roads Act 1756 (29 Geo. 2. c. 88)) (Note: Marylebone Road Act 1783 (23 Geo. 3. c. 110)) (Note: Kilburn Bridge Road Act 1808 (48 Geo. 3. c. c)) for repairing the Road from Saint Giles's Pound to Kilbourn Bridge; and for making a new Road from the Great Northern Road at Islington, to the Edgeware Road near Paddington, in the County of Middlesex.
Knightley's Estate Act 1813 (repealed)	53 Geo. 3. c. clxvi	22 June 1813
An Act for vesting Part of the settled Estates of Sir Charles Knightley Baronet, which were devised by the Will of Lucy Knightley Esquire, in Trustees, to be sold; and for laying out the Money arising thereby, in the Purchase of other Estates to be settled in lieu thereof and to the same Uses; and for other Purposes. (Repealed by Knightley's Estate Act 1818 (58 Geo. 3. c. 31 Pr.))
Whittaker's Estate Act 1813	53 Geo. 3. c. clxvii	22 June 1813
An Act for vesting certain detached settled Estates late of William Whittaker Esquire, deceased, in Trustees, to sell the same; and to lay out the Monies thence arising, in the Purchase of other Estates, to be settled to the same Uses.
Churchill's Estate Act 1813	53 Geo. 3. c. clxviii	22 June 1813
An Act for repealing so much of Two several Acts, passed in the Twenty third Year of the Reign of His late Majesty King George the Second, (Note: Churchill's Estate Act 1749 (23 Geo. 2. c. 18 Pr.)) and the Thirty second Year of the Reign of His present Majesty, (Note: Churchill's Estate Act 1792 (32 Geo. 3. c. 39 Pr.)) as are contrary to the Provisions contained in the Will of Charles Churchill Esquire, deceased, or the Settlement made on the Marriage of Charles Churchill Esquire with the Lady Maria Walpole.
Harrison's Estate Act 1813	53 Geo. 3. c. clxix	22 June 1813
An Act for vesting certain Estates devised by the Will of James Harrison Esquire, situate in the Counties of Lancaster and Chester, or one of them, in Trustees, to be sold pursuant to an Agreement entered into for that Purpose.
Phillipps' Estate Act 1813	53 Geo. 3. c. clxx	22 June 1813
An Act for vesting Part of the settled Estates of Thomas John Phillips, of Newport House in the County of Cornwall, Esquire, an Infant, in Trustees, to be sold; and for investing the clear Monies thence arising, under the Direction of the High Court of Chancery, in the Purchase of other Estates, to be settled in lieu thereof, and to the same Uses.
Popham's Estate Act 1813	53 Geo. 3. c. clxxi	22 June 1813
An Act for vesting Part of the Settled Estates of Edward William Leyborne Popham Esquire, in the Counties of Wilts and Berks, in Trustees, to be sold; and for investing the clear Monies thence arising, under the Direction of the High Court of Chancery, in the Purchase of other Estates to be settled in lieu thereof, and to the same Uses.
East Bedfont with Hatton Inclosure Act 1813	53 Geo. 3. c. clxxii	22 June 1813
An Act for inclosing Lands in the Manor of East Bedfont with Hatton, in the Parish of East Bedfont, in the County of Middlesex.
Undermilbeck Inclosure Act 1813	53 Geo. 3. c. clxxiii	22 June 1813
An Act for inclosing Lands within the Township of Undermilbeck, in the Parishes of Windermere and Kirkby in Kendal, in the County of Westmoreland.
Isleworth, Heston and Twickenham Inclosures Act 1813	53 Geo. 3. c. clxxiv	22 June 1813
An Act for inclosing Lands in the Parishes of Isleworth, Heston and Twickenham, in the Manor of Ileworth Syon, in the County of Middlesex.
Burghwallis Inclosure Act 1813	53 Geo. 3. c. clxxv	22 June 1813
An Act for inclosing Lands in Burghwallis, in the County of York.
Calne, Calstone-Wellington and Blackland Inclosures Act 1813	53 Geo. 3. c. clxxvi	22 June 1813
An Act for inclosing Lands in the several Parishes of Calne, Calstone Wellington and Blackland, in the County of Wilts.
Crowle, Eastoft and Ealand Inclosures Act 1813	53 Geo. 3. c. clxxvii	22 June 1813
An Act for inclosing Lands in the Townships of Crowle, Eastoft and Ealand, in the Parish of Crowle, in the County of Lincoln, and extending into the West Riding of the County of York.
Winterbourne Monckton Inclosure Act 1813	53 Geo. 3. c. clxxviii	22 June 1813
An Act for inclosing Lands in the Parish of Winterbourne Monckton, in the County of Wilts.
Lee's Hemp and Flax Preparation Invention Act 1813	53 Geo. 3. c. clxxix	2 July 1813
An Act for securing to James Lee, and the Public, the Benefit of his Invention of certain new Methods of preparing Hemp and Flax, by enabling him to lodge the Specification under certain Restrictions.
Tewkesbury Gaol Act 1813 (repealed)	53 Geo. 3. c. clxxx	2 July 1813
An Act for erecting a new Gaol House of Correction, and Penitentiary House, in the Borough of Tewkesbury, in the County of Gloucester. (Repealed by Statute Law (Repeals) Act 2008 (c. 12))
Thames and Severn Canal Act 1813	53 Geo. 3. c. clxxxi	2 July 1813
An Act for altering and amending an Act made in the Twenty third Year of the Reign of His present Majesty, (Note: Thames and Severn Canal Act 1783 (23 Geo. 3. c. 38)) for making and maintaining the Thames and Severn Canal Navigation.
North Wilts Canal Act 1813 (repealed)	53 Geo. 3. c. clxxxii	2 July 1813
An Act for making and maintaining a Navigable Canal, from the Wilts and Berks Canal, in the Parish of Swindon, in the County of Wilts, to communicate with the Thames and Severn Canal in the Parish of Latton, in the same County. (Repealed by Wilts and Berks Canal Navigation Act 1821 (1 & 2 Geo. 4. c. xcvii))
Bury, Loughor and Lliedi Rivers Navigation Act 1813	53 Geo. 3. c. clxxxiii	2 July 1813
An Act for the Improvement of the Navigation of the Rivers Bury, Loughor and Lliedi, in the Counties of Carmarthan and Glamorgan.
Strand Bridge Act 1813 (repealed)	53 Geo. 3. c. clxxxiv	2 July 1813
An Act for altering, enlarging, and extending the Powers of an Act of His present Majesty, (Note: Strand Bridge Act 1809 (49 Geo. 3. c. cxci)) for building a Bridge over the River Thames, at the Precinct of the Savoy, or near thereunto; and making Roads and Avenues to communicate therewith, in the Counties of Middlesex and Surrey. (Repealed by Local Law (Greater London Council and Inner London Boroughs) Order 1965 (SI 1965/540))
Fitzwilliam Square, Dublin, Improvement Act 1813	53 Geo. 3. c. clxxxv	2 July 1813
An Act for inclosing, lighting and improving Fitzwilliam Square, in the County of the City of Dublin.
Roads in Montgomery, Merioneth and Salop Act 1813 (repealed)	53 Geo. 3. c. clxxxvi	2 July 1813
An Act for repairing and improving several Roads in the Counties of Montgomery, Merioneth and Salop; and other Roads therein mentioned. (Repealed by Montgomery, Merioneth, Salop. and Denbigh Roads Act 1834 (4 & 5 Will. 4. c. xxxi))
Roads from Bowes and from Maiden Castle Act 1813	53 Geo. 3. c. clxxxvii	2 July 1813
An Act for enlarging the Term and Powers of an Act of King George the Second, (Note: Westmorland Roads Act 1742 (16 Geo. 2. c. 3)) and Two Acts of His present Majesty, (Note: Yorkshire Roads (No. 2) Act 1769 (9 Geo. 3. c. 75)) (Note: Yorkshire and Westmorland Roads Act 1791 (31 Geo. 3. c. 122)) for repairing the Road from Bowes, in the County of York, to Brough under Stainmore, in the County of Westmorland; and for repairing and widening the Road from Maiden Castle to Kaber Cross, and other Roads therein mentioned, in the said Counties.
Maidstone and Cranbrook Road Act 1813	53 Geo. 3. c. clxxxviii	2 July 1813
An Act for enlarging the Term and Powers of an Act of King George the Second, (Note: Maidstone to Cranbrook Road Act 1759 (33 Geo. 2. c. 57)) and Two Acts of His present Majesty, (Note: Maidstone to Cranbrook Road Act 1768 (8 Geo. 3. c. 43)) (Note: Road from Maidstone to Cranbrook Act 1802 (42 Geo. 3. c. lxv)) for amending the Road from Maidstone, in the County of Kent, to Tubb's Lake, in the Parish of Cranbrook, in the said County.
Earl of Dartmouth's Estate Act 1813	53 Geo. 3. c. clxxxix	2 July 1813
An Act for enabling the Right Honourable William Earl of Dartmouth to grant building Leases of his settled Estates, situate in the Counties of York, Kent and Middlesex.
Wellesley and Hodges Estates Act 1813	53 Geo. 3. c. cxc	2 July 1813
An Act for enabling the Honourable and Reverend Gerald Valerian Wellesley, Doctor in Divinity, and the Reverend Richard Hodges to grant Building Leases, of several undivided Shares in a Piece of Land, called Chelsea Common, in the Parish of Saint Luke, Chelsea, in the County of Middlesex, pursuant to an Agreement entered into for that Purpose
Camberwell Parish and Glebe Lands Act 1813	53 Geo. 3. c. cxci	2 July 1813
An Act to enable the Vicar of the Parish and Parish Church of Camberwell, in the County of Surry, to grant Leases of the Glebe belonging to the said Vicarage.
Saunders' Estate Act 1813	53 Geo. 3. c. cxcii	2 July 1813
An Act for vesting the Estates devised by the Will of the late Thomas Saunders Esquire, in Trustees, to be sold, and for applying the Monies thence arising for the Purposes and in manner therein mentioned.
Campion's Marriage Settlement Act 1813	53 Geo. 3. c. cxciii	2 July 1813
An Act for substituting and appointing a new Trustee in the Place or Stead of Francis Lucius Austen Esquire, for the Purposes of the Settlement made upon the Marriage of William John Campion Esquire, with Jane Austen Spinster, now the Wife of the said William John Campion; and also of the Will and Codicil of Henry Courthope Campion Esquire, deceased, so far as respects the Freehold and Copyhold or Customary Estates thereby respectively devised to the Uses or upon the Trusts of the said Settlement, and for vesting the Trust Estates accordingly.
Duncombe's Estate Act 1813	53 Geo. 3. c. cxciv	2 July 1813
An Act for vesting Part of the Estates devised by the Will of Thomas Duncombe Esquire, and other Lands settled to the same Uses, in Trustees, to be sold, and for laying out the Money to arise from the Sale thereof in the Purchase of other Estates, to be settled in lieu thereof to the same Uses.
Sinclair's Estate Act 1813	53 Geo. 3. c. cxcv	2 July 1813
An Act for exchanging the Lands of Brabsterdorran, and other Heritages belonging to Henrietta Sinclair, as Heir under an Entail, made by David Sinclair of Southdun, deceased, for other Lands and Heritages belonging to her in Fee Simple; and for vesting the said Lands of Brabsterdorran, and other Heritages, in Trustees, for the Purposes therein mentioned.
Lee's Estate Act 1813	53 Geo. 3. c. cxcvi	2 July 1813
An Act for vesting the settled Estates of Edward Lee Esquire and Elizabeth his Wife, in the Counties of Waterford and Dublin, and in the County of the City of Dublin, in Trustees, to be sold, and for laying out the Monies thence arising in the Purchase of other Estates to be settled to the same Uses as the Estates so sold.
Holt's Estate Act 1813	53 Geo. 3. c. cxcvii	2 July 1813
An Act for vesting certain Estates devised by the Will of Thomas Holt Esquire, in the County of Suffolk, in Trust for Sale; and for laying out the Monies thence arising in the Purchase of other Estates, to be fettled to the same Uses.
Withington Inclosure Act 1813	53 Geo. 3. c. cxcviii	2 July 1813
An Act for inclosing Lands in the Parish of Withington, in the County of Gloucester.
Bicester and Aylesbury Road Act 1813 (repealed)	53 Geo. 3. c. cxcix	6 July 1813
An Act for enlarging the Term of Two Acts of His present Majesty, (Note: Bicester and Aylesbury Road Act 1770 (10 Geo. 3. c. 72)) (Note: Bicester to Aylesbury Road Act 1791 (31 Geo. 3. c. 101)) for repairing and widening the Road from Bicester, in the County of Oxford, to Aylesbury, in the County of Bucks. (Repealed by Bicester and Aylesbury Road Act 1833 (3 & 4 Will. 4. c. xxiv))
Bicester and Aynho Road and Branch Act 1813 (repealed)	53 Geo. 3. c. cc	6 July 1813
An Act for enlarging the Term and Powers of an Act of His present Majesty, (Note: Bicester to Aynho Road Act 1791 (31 Geo. 3. c. 103)) for repairing the Road from the Market Place in Bicester, in the County of Oxford, to the Buckingham Turnpike Road in Aynho, in the County of Northampton; and for extending the Powers of the said Act to an adjoining Branch of Road. (Repealed by Statute Law (Repeals) Act 2013 (c. 2))
Wainfleet St. Mary Inclosure Act 1813	53 Geo. 3. c. cci	7 July 1813
An Act for embanking, inclosing and draining Lands in the Parish of Wainfleet Saint Mary, in the County of Lincoln.
Seabright's Estate Act 1813	53 Geo. 3. c. ccii	7 July 1813
An Act to enable the Trustees of certain Lands, demised by the Will of William Seabright, deceased, situate in the Township of Bednal Green otherwise Bethen Hall Green, in the Parish of Stepney otherwise Stabinheath, in the County of Middlesex, to grant Building Leases thereof.
Hall's Estate Act 1813	53 Geo. 3. c. cciii	7 July 1813
An Act for enabling William Hall Esquire to assign or surrender a Term of One thousand Years, in Estates, in the County of Oxford, unto or in Trust for Elisha Biscoe Esquire; and for other Purposes.
Gibson's Estate Act 1813	53 Geo. 3. c. cciv	7 July 1813
An Act for enabling Trustees under the Direction of the High Court of Chancery, to grant Building Leases of Part of the Estates of Thomas Milner Gibson Esquire, deceased, in Lambeth, in the County of Surry, and in Islington, in the County of Middlesex; and also under the like Direction, to raise Money by Sale or Mortgage of the same Estates, for Payment of Charges and Incumbrances thereon; and for other Purposes.
Lowndes' Estate Act 1813	53 Geo. 3. c. ccv	7 July 1813
An Act for confirming the Purchase of a Term of Years in an Estate at Knightsbridge in the County of Middlesex, being Part of the Settled Estates of William Lowndes the elder, Esquire, deceased, and for vesting Part of the said Settled Estates in Trustees, to be sold, and for laying out the clear Monies thence arising, under the Direction of the High Court of Chancery, in the Purchase of other Estates to be settled in lieu of the Estates sold, and to the same Uses; and to enable Trustees to grant Building Leases of Part of the said Settled Estates; and for other Purposes.
Hope Assurance Company Act 1813	53 Geo. 3. c. ccvi	10 July 1813
An Act to enable The Hope Assurance Company to sue and be sued; to grant Annuities, and to enrol Memorials thereof, under certain Regulations.
Eagle Insurance Company Act 1813	53 Geo. 3. c. ccvii	10 July 1813
An Act to enable The Eagle Insurance Company to sue and be sued in the Name of their Secretary or any Member thereof; and to inrol Annuities.
Sussex Roads Act 1813	53 Geo. 3. c. ccviii	10 July 1813
An Act for amending the Roads from Hodges to Beadles Hill and Cuckfield, and from Beadles Hill to Lindfield, and from the Cuckfield and Crawley Road to Horsham, and from Swingate to Shover Green, all in the County of Sussex.
Archbishop of Canterbury's Estate Act 1813	53 Geo. 3. c. ccix	10 July 1813
An Act for enabling the Archbishop of Canterbury to convey certain Tenements at Deal, in the County of Kent, to or in Trust for His Majesty, for the Public Service.
Viscount Bateman's Estate Act 1813	53 Geo. 3. c. ccx	12 July 1813
An Act for vesting certain Estates devised by the Right Honourable John Viscount Bateman, deceased, in Trustees, to be sold, and for laying out the Monies arising therefrom, under the Direction of the High Court of Chancery, in the Purchase of other Estates to be settled to the same Uses.
Marine Insurance Company of Dublin Act 1813	53 Geo. 3. c. ccxi	13 July 1813
An Act to enable The Marine Insurance Company of Dublin to sue and be sued in the Name of their Secretary or Secretaries.
Phoenix Assurance Company of London Act 1813 or the Phoenix Assurance Company's Act 1813 (repealed)	53 Geo. 3. c. ccxii	20 July 1813
An Act to enable The Phoenix Assurance Company of London to sue and be sued in the Name of their Secretary or any Member. (Repealed by Phoenix Assurance Company's Act 1895 (58 & 59 Vict. c. lxxiii))
Earl of Leicester's Hospital, Warwick Act 1813 (repealed)	53 Geo. 3. c. ccxiii	20 July 1813
An Act for altering the Rules, Statutes and Ordinances of the Hospital of Robert Earl of Leicester, in Warwick; and for enabling the Master and Brethren of the said Hospital to raise Money on the Security of the Estates thereof, in order to provide for the Reception of additional Brethren therein. (Repealed by Statute Law (Repeals) Act 2013 (c. 2))
River Cam Navigation Act 1813 (repealed)	53 Geo. 3. c. ccxiv	21 July 1813
An Act for extending and amending an Act of Queen Anne, (Note: River Cam Navigation Act 1702 (1 Ann. St. 2 c. 11)) for making the River Cham more navigable from Clayhithe Ferry to the Queen's Mill, in the County of Cambridge. (Repealed by River Cam Navigation Act 1851 (14 & 15 Vict. c. xcii))
Norwich Union Life Insurance Society Act 1813 (repealed)	53 Geo. 3. c. ccxv	21 July 1813
An Act to enable The Norwich Union Society for the Insurance of Lives and Survivorships to sue in the Name of their Secretary, and to be sued in the Names of their Directors, Treasurers and Secretary. (Repealed by Norwich Union Life Insurance Society Act 1891 (54 & 55 Vict. c. xxxvi))
Norwich Union Fire Insurance Society Act 1813	53 Geo. 3. c. ccxvi	21 July 1813
An Act to enable The Norwich Union Society for Insurance against Loss by Fire to sue in the Name of their Secretary, and to be sued in the Names of their Directors, Treasurers and Secretary.

=== Private acts ===
Short title	Citation	Royal assent
Long title
Cotterstock-cum-Glapthorn Inclosure Act 1813	53 Geo. 3. c. 1 Pr.	23 March 1813
An Act for inclosing Lands in the Parish of Cotterstock cum Glapthorn, in the County of Northampton.
Greystoke Inclosure Act 1813	53 Geo. 3. c. 2 Pr.	23 March 1813
An Act for inclosing Lands in the Parish of Greystoke, in the County of Cumberland.
Marston Trussell Inclosure Act 1813	53 Geo. 3. c. 3 Pr.	23 March 1813
An Act for inclosing Lands in the Parish of Marston Trussell, in the County of Northampton.
Eastnor Inclosure Act 1813	53 Geo. 3. c. 4 Pr.	23 March 1813
An Act for inclosing Lands in the Parish of Eastnor, in the County of Hereford.
Greenford Inclosure Act 1813	53 Geo. 3. c. 5 Pr.	23 March 1813
An Act for inclosing Lands in the Parish of Greenford, in the County of Middlesex.
Hanwell Inclosure Act 1813	53 Geo. 3. c. 6 Pr.	23 March 1813
An Act for inclosing Lands in the Parish of Hanwell, in the County of Middlesex.
Hornsey Inclosure Act 1813	53 Geo. 3. c. 7 Pr.	23 March 1813
An Act for inclosing Lands in the Parish of Hornsey, in the County of Middlesex.
Windeler's Naturalization Act 1813	53 Geo. 3. c. 8 Pr.	23 March 1813
An Act for naturalizing Johan Diederich Windeler.
Swinbrooke Inclosure Act 1813	53 Geo. 3. c. 9 Pr.	1 April 1813
An Act for inclosing, and exonerating from Tithes, Lands in the Parish of Swinbrooke, in the County of Oxford.
Clehonger Inclosure Act 1813	53 Geo. 3. c. 10 Pr.	1 April 1813
An Act for inclosing Lands in the Parish of Clehonger, in the County of Hereford.
Great Stanmore Inclosure Act 1813	53 Geo. 3. c. 11 Pr.	1 April 1813
An Act for inclosing Lands in the Parish of Great Stanmore, in the County of Middlesex.
North Piddle Inclosure Act 1813	53 Geo. 3. c. 12 Pr.	1 April 1813
An Act for inclosing Lands in the Parish of North Piddle, in the County of Worcester.
Warter Inclosure Act 1813	53 Geo. 3. c. 13 Pr.	1 April 1813
An Act to explain and amend an Act of His present Majesty, (Note: Warter Inclosure Act 1794 (34 Geo. 3. c. 3 Pr.)) for inclosing Lands within the Lordship and Township of Warter, in the East Riding of the County of York.
Sockbridge, Yanwath, &c. Inclosure Act 1813	53 Geo. 3. c. 14 Pr.	1 April 1813
An Act for inclosing Lands in the Manors of Sockbridge, Yanwath and Eamont Bridge, in the Parish of Barton, in the County of Westmorland.
Little Shelford Inclosure Act 1813	53 Geo. 3. c. 15 Pr.	1 April 1813
An Act for inclosing Lands in the Parish of Little Shelford, in the County of Cambridge.
Salwarp Inclosure Act 1813	53 Geo. 3. c. 16 Pr.	1 April 1813
An Act for inclosing Lands in the Parish of Salwarp, in the County of Worcester.
Upton Inclosure Act 1813	53 Geo. 3. c. 17 Pr.	1 April 1813
An Act for inclosing Lands called Upton Common, in the Township or Manor of Upton, in the Parish of Idsall otherwise Shiffnal, in the County of Salop.
Burnet's Estate Act 1813	53 Geo. 3. c. 18 Pr.	15 April 1813
An Act for vesting the Messuages and Hereditaments settled on the Marriage of Henry Burnet Esquire, and Mary his Wife, in Trustees, upon Trust, to convey the same to Henry James Brooke Esquire, his Heirs and Assigns, pursuant to Articles of Agreement made for the Sale thereof, and for laying out the Money to arise by such Sale in the Purchase of other Estates, and for settling the same to the former Uses.
Webb's Estate Act 1813	53 Geo. 3. c. 19 Pr.	15 April 1813
An Act for vesting the undivided Fourth Part of Edward Webb and Elizabeth Frances Webb, an Infant, in Estates in the Counties of Buckingham, Middlesex, and Oxford, in Trust, to be sold, and for laying out the Monies thence arising in the Purchase of other Estates, to be settled to the same Uses as the Estates sold.
Townhill Inclosure Act 1813	53 Geo. 3. c. 20 Pr.	15 April 1813
An Act for inclosing Lands in the Manor of Townhill otherwise Shamblehurst, in the Parish of South Stoneham, in the County of Southampton.
Seething, &c. Inclosure Act 1813	53 Geo. 3. c. 21 Pr.	15 April 1813
An Act for inclosing Lands within the Parishes of Seethin, Kirkstead, Mundham and Sisland, in the County of Norfolk.
Wramplingham Inclosure Act 1813	53 Geo. 3. c. 22 Pr.	15 April 1813
An Act for inclosing Lands in the Parish of Wramplingham, in the County of Norfolk.
Croxton Inclosure Act 1813	53 Geo. 3. c. 23 Pr.	15 April 1813
An Act for inclosing Lands in the Parish of Croxton, in the County of Norfolk.
Kilburn Inclosure Act 1813	53 Geo. 3. c. 24 Pr.	15 April 1813
An Act for inclosing Lands in the Township of High and Low Kilburn, in the Parish of Kilburn, in the County of York.
Laleham Burway Inclosure Act 1813	53 Geo. 3. c. 25 Pr.	15 April 1813
An Act for inclosing certain Land called Laleham Burway, in the Parish of Laleham, in the County of Middlesex, or in the Parish of Chertsey, in the County of Surry, or one of them.
Warminghurst, &c. Inclosure Act 1813	53 Geo. 3. c. 26 Pr.	15 April 1813
An Act for inclosing Lands within the several Manors of Warminghurst, Ashington and Chankton, in the County of Sussex.
Eartham Inclosure Act 1813	53 Geo. 3. c. 27 Pr.	15 April 1813
An Act for inclosing Lands in the Manor and Parish of Eartham, in the County of Sussex.
Farlington Inclosure Act 1813	53 Geo. 3. c. 28 Pr.	1 May 1813
An Act for inclosing Lands in the Parish of Farlington, in the County of York.
Icklingham Inclosure Act 1813	53 Geo. 3. c. 29 Pr.	1 May 1813
An Act for dividing Lands in the Township of Icklingham, in the County of Suffolk.
Whepstead Inclosure Act 1813	53 Geo. 3. c. 30 Pr.	1 May 1813
An Act for dividing the Commons and Waste Grounds within the Parish of Whepstead, in the County of Suffolk.
Chudleigh Inclosure Act 1813	53 Geo. 3. c. 31 Pr.	1 May 1813
An Act for inclosing Lands in the Parish of Chudleigh, in the County of Devon.
Bluntisham, &c. Inclosure Act 1813	53 Geo. 3. c. 32 Pr.	1 May 1813
An Act for inclosing Lands in the Parishes of Bluntisham with Earith and Colne, in the County of Huntingdon.
Lord Blantyre's Estate Act 1813	53 Geo. 3. c. 33 Pr.	21 May 1813
An Act for vesting certain Parts of the Lands and Hereditaments comprized in the Deeds of Entail made by Thomas Viscount of Teviot and others, and now by virtue thereof, in the Possession of Robert Walter Lord Blantyre, in Trustees, in Trust, to sell the same, and invest the Money arising by such Sale in the Purchase of other Lands or Hereditaments, to be settled and secured to the same Series of Heirs, and under the fame Conditions and Limitations as are contained in the said Deeds of Entail.
Kinmount Estate Act 1813	53 Geo. 3. c. 34 Pr.	21 May 1813
An Act for settling and securing the Lands and Estate of Kinninmouth, or Kinmount; and others, in the County of Dumfries, to and in favour of Charles Marquis of Queensberry, and the Series of Heirs entitled to take by a certain Deed of Entail made by Charles Duke of Queensberry and Dover, deceased, and under the Conditions and Limitations contained in the said Deed; and for vesting in lieu thereof the Barony and Estate of Craigs, and certain Parts of the Lands of Tinwall, Burnskairth and Dargavel or Lochermoss, in the said County, in the said Charles Marquis of Queensberry, and his Heirs and Assigns in Fee Simple.
Kimpton's Estate Act 1813	53 Geo. 3. c. 35 Pr.	21 May 1813
An Act for vesting certain Farms, Lands and Hereditaments, situate in the County of Essex, the settled Estates of Harvey Kimpton Esquire, in Trustees, upon Trust to sell, and for laying out the Monies arising from such Sales in the Purchase of other Estates; and for other Purposes therein mentioned.
Ledbury Inclosure Act 1813	53 Geo. 3. c. 36 Pr.	21 May 1813
An Act for inclosing Lands in the Parish of Ledbury, in the County of Hereford.
Flyford Flavell Inclosure Act 1813	53 Geo. 3. c. 37 Pr.	21 May 1813
An Act for inclosing Lands in the Parish of Flyford Flavell, in the County of Worcester.
Great Horkesley and Boxted Inclosure Act 1813	53 Geo. 3. c. 38 Pr.	21 May 1813
An Act for inclosing Lands in the Parish of Great Horkesley, and in the Manor of Rivers Hall in Boxtead, in the County of Essex.
Knowle Inclosure Act 1813	53 Geo. 3. c. 39 Pr.	21 May 1813
An Act for inclosing Lands in the Manor of Knowle, in the several Parishes of Solihull and Hampton in Arden, in the County of Warwick.
Great Rissington Inclosure Act 1813	53 Geo. 3. c. 40 Pr.	21 May 1813
An Act for inclosing Lands in the Parish of Great Rissington, in the County of Gloucester.
Cwmyoy and Llanthony Inclosure Act 1813	53 Geo. 3. c. 41 Pr.	21 May 1813
An Act for inclosing Lands in the Parish of Cwmyoy, and Chapelry of Llanthony, in the County of Monmouth.
Ebrington, &c. Inclosure Act 1813	53 Geo. 3. c. 42 Pr.	21 May 1813
An Act for inclosing Lands within the Township of Ebrington and the Hamlet of Hitcoat otherwise Hitcott, in the County of Gloucester.
Amberley Inclosure Act 1813	53 Geo. 3. c. 43 Pr.	21 May 1813
An Act for amending and rendering more effectual an Act of the Fiftieth Year of His present Majesty, (Note: Amberley Inclosure Act 1810 (50 Geo. 3. c. 35 Pr.)) for inclosing Lands in the Manor of Amberly, in the County of Sussex.
Much Cowarn Inclosure Act 1813	53 Geo. 3. c. 44 Pr.	21 May 1813
An Act for inclosing Lands in the Parish of Much Cowarn, in the County of Hereford.
Fairburn Inclosure Act 1813	53 Geo. 3. c. 45 Pr.	21 May 1813
An Act for inclosing Lands within the Township of Fairburn, in the Weft Riding of the County of York.
Morley Inclosure Act 1813	53 Geo. 3. c. 46 Pr.	21 May 1813
An Act for inclosing Lands in the Parish of Morley otherwise the Parishes of Morley Saint Buttolph and Morley Saint Peter, in the County of Norfolk.
Woodton Inclosure Act 1813	53 Geo. 3. c. 47 Pr.	21 May 1813
An Act for inclosing Lands in the Parish of Woodton, in the County of Norfolk.
Priors Ditton Inclosure Act 1813	53 Geo. 3. c. 48 Pr.	21 May 1813
An Act for inclosing Lands in the Parish of Priors Ditton, in the County of Salop.
Chevington, &c. Inclosure Act 1813	53 Geo. 3. c. 49 Pr.	21 May 1813
An Act for inclosing Lands in the Parishes of Chevington and Chedburgh, in the County of Suffolk.
Great Horningsheath and Westley Inclosure Act 1813	53 Geo. 3. c. 50 Pr.	21 May 1813
An Act for inclosing Lands in the Parishes of Great Horningsheath otherwise Horningsherth and Westley, in the County of Suffolk.
Brigham Inclosure Act 1813	53 Geo. 3. c. 51 Pr.	21 May 1813
An Act for inclosing Lands in the Township of Brigham, in the Manor of Five Towns with Eaglesfield, in the County of Cumberland.
Cockermouth Inclosure Act 1813	53 Geo. 3. c. 52 Pr.	21 May 1813
An Act for inclosing Lands in the Borough and Township of Cockermouth, in the County of Cumberland.
Setmurthy Inclosure Act 1813	53 Geo. 3. c. 53 Pr.	21 May 1813
An Act for inclosing Lands in the Townships of Setmurthy and Embleton, in the Manor of Derwentfells, in the County of Cumberland.
St. John Inclosure Act 1813	53 Geo. 3. c. 54 Pr.	21 May 1813
An Act for inclosing certain Waste Lands within the Parish of Saint John, in the County of Cumberland.
Chamberlain's Divorce Act 1813	53 Geo. 3. c. 55 Pr.	21 May 1813
An Act to dissolve the Marriage of Henry Chamberlain Esquire with Eliza otherwise Elizabeth Chamberlain, his now Wife, and to enable him to marry again; and for other Purposes therein mentioned.
Campbell's Estate Act 1813	53 Geo. 3. c. 56 Pr.	3 June 1813
An Act for vesting certain Parts of the Lands and Hereditaments comprized in a Deed of Entail made by Archibald Campbell, late of Shirvan, deceased, in Trustees, to sell the same, and invest the Money arising by such Sale in the Purchase of other Lands or Hereditaments, to be settled and secured to the same Series of Heirs, and under the same Conditions and Limitations as are contained in the said Deed of Entail.
Johnston's Estate Act 1813	53 Geo. 3. c. 57 Pr.	3 June 1813
An Act for carrying into Effect certain Agreement made between the Reverend Doctor David Johnston, Minister of the Parish of North Leith, and the Reverend Doctor Walter Foggo Ireland, ordained and appointed Assistant and Successor to the said Doctor David Johnston, in the said Parish of North Leith, and the Kirk Session thereof, with the Consent of the Presbytery of Edinburgh, and John Campbell, Writer to His Majesty's Signet.
Turner's Estate Act 1813	53 Geo. 3. c. 58 Pr.	3 June 1813
An Act for enabling the Administrators of George Turner, deceased, to complete a Contract made by him for the Sale of Part of his Fee Simple Estates.
Rougham Inclosure Act 1813	53 Geo. 3. c. 59 Pr.	3 June 1813
An Act for inclosing, and exonerating from Tithes, Lands in the Parish of Rougham, in the County of Suffolk.
Stretton Grandsome, &c. Inclosure Act 1813	53 Geo. 3. c. 60 Pr.	3 June 1813
An Act for inclosing Lands in the Parish of Stretton Grandsome and Township of Egleton, in the Parish of Bishops Froome, in the County of Hereford.
Upper Elkstone Inclosure Act 1813	53 Geo. 3. c. 61 Pr.	3 June 1813
An Act for inclosing Lands in Upper Elkstone, in the County of Stafford.
Boxted Hall Inclosure Act 1813	53 Geo. 3. c. 62 Pr.	3 June 1813
An Act for inclosing Lands in the Manor of Boxtead Hall, in the County of Essex.
Kennet Inclosure Act 1813	53 Geo. 3. c. 63 Pr.	3 June 1813
An Act for inclosing Lands in the Parish of Kennet, in the County of Cambridge.
Wood Ditton Inclosure Act 1813	53 Geo. 3. c. 64 Pr.	3 June 1813
An Act for inclosing Lands in the Parish of Wood Ditton in the County of Cambridge.
Eastrington Inclosure Act 1813	53 Geo. 3. c. 65 Pr.	3 June 1813
An Act for inclosing Lands in the Parish of Eastrington, in the County of York.
Tasburgh Inclosure Act 1813	53 Geo. 3. c. 66 Pr.	3 June 1813
An Act for inclosing Lands in the Parish of Tasburgh, in the County of Norfolk.
Newmarket Inclosure Act 1813	53 Geo. 3. c. 67 Pr.	3 June 1813
An Act for inclosing Lands in the Parish of Saint Mary, in Newmarket, in the County of Suffolk.
Sandford's Name Act 1813	53 Geo. 3. c. 68 Pr.	3 June 1813
An Act to enable the Reverend Benjamin Sandford to take the Name and bear the Arms of Winston, pursuant to the Will of Charles Winston, deceased.
Haldane's Estate Act 1813	53 Geo. 3. c. 69 Pr.	22 June 1813
An Act for empowering the Judges of the Court of Session in Scotland to sell such Parts and Portions of the entailed Estates of Gleneagles, Haldane and Aberuthven, situated in the Counties of Perth, Stirling and Dunbarton, which belonged to and were entailed by Robert Haldane, of Gleneagles, deceased, as shall be sufficient for Payment of the Debts of the said Robert Haldane still owing, and which affect or may be made to affect the said entailed Estates.
Morehead's Estate Act 1813	53 Geo. 3. c. 70 Pr.	22 June 1813
An Act for settling and securing the Lands and Estate of West Boreland, and others, in the County of Stirling, to and in favour of William Morehead Esquire, and the Series of Heirs entitled to take, by a certain Deed of Entail made by William Morehead Esquire, deceased, under the Conditions and Limitations in the said Deed, and for vesting in lieu thereof, certain Parts of the Lands and Barony of Herbertshire, in the said County, in certain Trustees nominated by the said William Morehead, deceased, for the Purposes of the Trust, and for empowering the Court of Session in Scotland to sell certain Parts and Portions of the said Entailed Estate of Herbertshire for Payment of the Debts contracted by the said William Morehead, deceased.
Llanfihangel, &c. Inclosure Act 1813	53 Geo. 3. c. 71 Pr.	22 June 1813
An Act for inclosing Lands in the several Parishes of Llanfihangel Generglyn and Llanganfelin, in the County of Cardigan.
Westmill Inclosure Act 1813	53 Geo. 3. c. 72 Pr.	22 June 1813
An Act for inclosing Lands in the Parish of Westmill, in the County of Hertford.
Longstanton Inclosure Act 1813	53 Geo. 3. c. 73 Pr.	22 June 1813
An Act for inclosing Lands in the Parish of Longstanton Saint Michael, in the County of Cambridge.
Little Gransden Inclosure Act 1813	53 Geo. 3. c. 74 Pr.	22 June 1813
An Act for inclosing Lands in the Parish of Little Gransden, in the County of Cambridge.
East Teignmouth Inclosure Act 1813	53 Geo. 3. c. 75 Pr.	2 July 1813
An Act for dividing and inclosing certain Tracts or Parcels of Moor, Common or Waste Grounds within and Parcel of the Manor of East Teignmouth, in the County of Devon.
Meldreth Inclosure Act 1813	53 Geo. 3. c. 76 Pr.	2 July 1813
An Act for inclosing Lands in the Parish of Meldreth, and for allotting Lands in the Parishes of Melbourn and Whaddon, in the County of Cambridge.
Frampton upon Severn, &c. Inclosure Act 1813	53 Geo. 3. c. 77 Pr.	2 July 1813
An Act for inclosing Lands in the Parish of Frampton upon Severn, in the County of Gloucester, and in the Parish of Slimbridge, in the said County.
Willis's Name Act 1813	53 Geo. 3. c. 78 Pr.	7 July 1813
An Act to enable John Fleming Barton Willis Esquire, and his Issue, to take the Name of Fleming, and bear the Arms of the Fleming Family, pursuant to the Will of John Fleming Esquire, deceased.
Reade's Estate Act 1813	53 Geo. 3. c. 79 Pr.	13 July 1813
An Act for vesting a Leasehold Messuage in Curzon Street, in the County of Middlesex, and other Effects, settled by the Will of Dame Harriott Reade, deceased, in Trustees, to be sold, and to lay out the Money thence arising in the Purchase of other Estates, to be settled in like manner.

=== Sources ===
- The Statutes of the United Kingdom of Great Britain and Ireland. 53 George III. 1813. Joseph Butterworth. 1813 – via Google Books.
- Journals of the House of Commons. Vol. 68. London: His Majesty's Stationery Office. pp. 3–675 – via Google Books.
- Chronological Table of and Index to the Statutes. Vol. 1: To the End of the Session 59 Vict. Sess. 2 (1895) (13th ed.). London: Her Majesty's Stationery Office. 1896. pp. 202–206 – via Google Books.

== 54 Geo. 3 ==
The second session of the 5th Parliament of the United Kingdom, which met from 4 November 1813 until 30 July 1814.

This session was also traditionally cited as 54 G. 3.

=== Public general acts ===
Short title	Citation	Royal assent
Long title
Militia (No. 2) Act 1813 (repealed)	54 Geo. 3. c. 1	24 November 1813
An Act to enable His Majesty to accept the Services of a Proportion of the Militia out of the United Kingdom, for the vigorous Prosecution of the War. (Repealed by Statute Law Revision Act 1861 (24 & 25 Vict. c. 101))
Duties on Malt, etc. Act 1813 (repealed)	54 Geo. 3. c. 2	26 November 1813
An Act for continuing to His Majesty certain Duties on Malt, Sugar, Tobacco and Snuff in Great Britain; and on Pensions, Offices and Personal Estates, in England, for the Service of the Year One thousand eight hundred and fourteen. (Repealed by Statute Law Revision Act 1873 (36 & 37 Vict. c. 91))
National Debt (No. 6) Act 1813 (repealed)	54 Geo. 3. c. 3	26 November 1813
An Act for raising the Sum of Twenty two Millions by way of Annuities. (Repealed by Statute Law Revision Act 1870 (33 & 34 Vict. c. 69))
Tokens Act 1813 (repealed)	54 Geo. 3. c. 4	26 November 1813
An Act to continue until Six Weeks after the Commencement of the next Session of Parliament, an Act passed in the last Session of Parliament, intituled, "An Act to continue and amend an Act of the present Session, to prevent the issuing and circulating of Pieces of Gold and Silvery or other Metal, usually called Tokens, except such as are issued by the Banks of England and Ireland respectively. (Repealed by Coinage Act 1870 (33 & 34 Vict. c. 10))
Indemnity Act 1813 (repealed)	54 Geo. 3. c. 5	6 December 1813
An Act to indemnify such Persons in the United Kingdom as have omitted to qualify themselves for Offices and Employments, and for extending the Times limited for those Purposes respectively, until the Twenty fifth Day of March One thousand eight hundred and fifteen; and to permit such Persons in Great Britain as have omitted to make and file Affidavits of the Execution of Indentures of Clerks to Attornies and Solicitors to make and file the same on or before the First Day of Hilary Term One thousand eight hundred and fifteen. (Repealed by Promissory Oaths Act 1871 (34 & 35 Vict. c. 48))
Actions Against Spiritual Persons Act 1813 (repealed)	54 Geo. 3. c. 6	6 December 1813
An Act to stay, until the Twentieth Day of April One thousand eight hundred and fourteen, Proceedings in Actions under an Act passed in the Forty third Year of His present Majesty, (Note: Benefices (England) Act 1803 (43 Geo. 3. c. 84)) to amend the Laws relating to Spiritual Persons. (Repealed by Statute Law Revision Act 1873 (36 & 37 Vict. c. 91))
Exportation (No. 8) Act 1813 (repealed)	54 Geo. 3. c. 7	6 December 1813
An Act to continue, until the Twenty fifth Day of March One thousand eight hundred and fifteen, and amend an Act for regulating the Drawbacks and Bounties on the Exportation of Sugar from Ireland. (Repealed by Statute Law Revision Act 1873 (36 & 37 Vict. c. 91))
National Debt Reduction (No. 2) Act 1813 (repealed)	54 Geo. 3. c. 8	6 December 1813
An Act to provide for the Charge of the Addition to the Public Funded Debt of Great Britain for the Service of the Year One thousand eight hundred and fourteen. (Repealed by Statute Law Revision Act 1870 (33 & 34 Vict. c. 69))
Distillation of Spirits (Scotland) Act 1813 (repealed)	54 Geo. 3. c. 9	6 December 1813
An Act for fixing the Commencement and Termination of Licences to be granted for the Distillation of Spirits from Corn or Grain in Scotland. (Repealed by Statute Law Revision Act 1873 (36 & 37 Vict. c. 91))
Militia (No. 3) Act 1813 (repealed)	54 Geo. 3. c. 10	6 December 1813
An Act to amend an Act passed in the Fifty first Year of the Reign of His present Majesty, intituled "An Act to permit the Interchange of the British and Irish Militias respectively." (Note: Militia (No. 2) Act 1811 (51 Geo. 3. c. 118)) (Repealed by Statute Law Revision Act 1873 (36 & 37 Vict. c. 91))
Militia (No. 4) Act 1813 (repealed)	54 Geo. 3. c. 11	6 December 1813
An Act for extending the Provisions of an Act, passed in the Forty sixth Year of His present Majesty, (Note: Pensions to Soldiers Act 1806 (46 Geo. 3. c. 69)) for making better Provision for Soldiers, to Serjeants of the Militia. (Repealed by Statute Law Revision Act 1861 (24 & 25 Vict. c. 101))
Augmentation of 60th Regiment Act 1813 (repealed)	54 Geo. 3. c. 12	6 December 1813
An Act to enable His Majesty to augment the Sixtieth Regiment to Ten Battalions, by Enlistment of Foreigners. (Repealed by Statute Law Revision Act 1861 (24 & 25 Vict. c. 101))
Aid to Russia, etc. Act 1813 (repealed)	54 Geo. 3. c. 13	6 December 1813
An Act for giving Effect to certain Engagements of His Majesty with the Emperor of all the Russias and the King of Prussia, for furnishing a Part of the pecuniary Succours for assisting His Majesty's said Allies, in supporting the Expences of the War with France. (Repealed by Statute Law Revision Act 1873 (36 & 37 Vict. c. 91))
Accountant-General of Court of Chancery Act 1813 (repealed)	54 Geo. 3. c. 14	6 December 1813
An Act to provide that Property vested in the Accountant General of the High Court of Chancery as such, shall, upon his Death, Removal or Resignation, vest from time to time in those who shall succeed to the Office. (Repealed by Court of Chancery (Funds) Act 1872 (35 & 36 Vict. c. 44))
New South Wales (Debts) Act 1813	54 Geo. 3. c. 15	6 December 1813
An act for the more easy Recovery of Debts, in His Majesty's Colony of New South Wales.
House of Commons (Disqualifications) Act 1813 or the House of Commons (Disqualifications) Act 1814 (repealed)	54 Geo. 3. c. 16	6 December 1813
An act to explain an Act of the Forty first Year of his present Majesty, for declaring what Persons shall be disabled from sitting and voting in the House of Commons of the United Kingdom of Great Britain and Ireland. (Repealed by Statute Law Revision Act 1950 (14 Geo. 6. c. 6))
City of London Militia Act 1813 (repealed)	54 Geo. 3. c. 17	6 December 1813
An Act to enable His Majesty to accept the Services of a Proportion of the Militia of the City of London, out of the United Kingdom, for the vigorous Prosecution of the War. (Repealed by Statute Law Revision Act 1861 (24 & 25 Vict. c. 101))
Exchequer Bills (No. 6) Act 1813 (repealed)	54 Geo. 3. c. 18	10 December 1813
An Act for raising the Sum of Ten millions five hundred thousand Pounds, by Exchequer Bills, for the Service of Great Britain, for the Year One thousand eight hundred and fourteen. (Repealed by Statute Law Revision Act 1873 (36 & 37 Vict. c. 91))
Local Militia (Great Britain) Act 1813 (repealed)	54 Geo. 3. c. 19	10 December 1813
An Act to enable His Majesty to accept the Services of the Local Militia out of their Counties, under certain Restrictions, and until the Twenty fifth Day of March One thousand eight hundred and fifteen. (Repealed by Statute Law Revision Act 1873 (36 & 37 Vict. c. 91))
Militia (No. 5) Act 1813 (repealed)	54 Geo. 3. c. 20	10 December 1813
An Act to explain and amend an Act passed in the present Session of Parliament (Note: Militia (No. 2) Act 1813 (54 Geo. 3. c. 1)) for enabling His Majesty to accept the Services of a Proportion of the Militia out of the United Kingdom, for the vigorous Prosecution of the War; and to extend the Provisions thereof to the Regiment of Miners of Cornwall and Devon. (Repealed by Statute Law Revision Act 1861 (24 & 25 Vict. c. 101))
Duty on Salt Act 1813 (repealed)	54 Geo. 3. c. 21	10 December 1813
An Act for charging an equalizing Duty on Scotch Salt brought to England. (Repealed by Statute Law Revision Act 1861 (24 & 25 Vict. c. 101))
Peace Preservation Act 1813 (repealed)	54 Geo. 3. c. 22	10 December 1813
An Act to continue, until the Twenty fifth Day of March One thousand eight hundred and fifteen, an Act of the Fifty second Year of His present Majesty, (Note: Preservation of the Peace Act 1812 (52 Geo. 3. c. 17)) for the more effectual Preservation of the Peace by enforcing the Duties of Watching and Warding. (Repealed by Statute Law Revision Act 1873 (36 & 37 Vict. c. 91))
Insolvent Debtors (England) (No. 2) Act 1813 (repealed)	54 Geo. 3. c. 23	10 December 1813
An Act to amend an Act of the Fifty third Year of His Majesty's Reign, intituled "An Act for the Relief of Insolvent Debtors in England." (Note: Insolvent Debtors (England) Act 1813 (53 Geo. 3. c. 102)) (Repealed by Statute Law Revision Act 1873 (36 & 37 Vict. c. 91))
Bounties, etc., on Sugar Act 1813 (repealed)	54 Geo. 3. c. 24	10 December 1813
An Act for further continuing, until the Twenty fifth Day of March One thousand eight hundred and fifteen, certain Bounties and Drawbacks on the Exportation of Sugar from Great Britain; and for suspending the Countervailing Duties and Bounties on Sugar, when the Duties imposed by an Act of the Forty ninth Year of His present Majesty (Note: Customs (No. 3) Act 1809 (49 Geo. 3. c. 98)) shall be suspended. (Repealed by Statute Law Revision Act 1873 (36 & 37 Vict. c. 91))
Mutiny (No. 2) Act 1813 (repealed)	54 Geo. 3. c. 25	10 December 1813
An Act for punishing Mutiny and Desertion; and for the better Payment of the Army and their Quarters. (Repealed by Statute Law Revision Act 1873 (36 & 37 Vict. c. 91))
Customs (No. 5) Act 1813 (repealed)	54 Geo. 3. c. 26	10 December 1813
An Act for repealing the Duties of Customs on Madder imported into Great Britain, and for granting other Duties in lieu thereof; to continue in force until the Fifth Day of January One thousand eight hundred and seventeen. (Repealed by Statute Law Revision Act 1873 (36 & 37 Vict. c. 91))
Customs (No. 6) Act 1813 (repealed)	54 Geo. 3. c. 27	14 December 1813
An Act to rectify a Mistake in an Act of the present Session of Parliament, (Note: Customs (No. 5) Act 1813 (54 Geo. 3. c. 26)) for repealing the Duties of Customs on Madder imported into Great Britain, and for granting other Duties in lieu thereof. (Repealed by Statute Law Revision Act 1873 (36 & 37 Vict. c. 91))
Insolvent Debtors Relief (England) Act 1813 (repealed)	54 Geo. 3. c. 28	14 December 1813
An Act for the Relief of certain Insolvent Debtors in England. (Repealed by Statute Law Revision Act 1873 (36 & 37 Vict. c. 91))
Customs (No. 7) Act 1813 (repealed)	54 Geo. 3. c. 29	14 December 1813
An Act to charge an additional Duty of Customs on Brandy imported into Great Britain for the Purpose of Exportation, and which shall be taken out of Warehouse for Home Consumption, before the Thirty first Day of March One thousand eight hundred and fourteen. (Repealed by Statute Law Revision Act 1873 (36 & 37 Vict. c. 91))
Transportation (No. 2) Act 1813 (repealed)	54 Geo. 3. c. 30	14 December 1813
An Act to continue until the Twenty fifth Day of March One thousand eight hundred and fifteen, and from thence to the End of the then next Session of Parliament, several Laws relating to the Transportation of Felons and other Offenders, and to the authorizing the Removal of Offenders to temporary Places of Confinement in England and Scotland. (Repealed by Statute Law Revision Act 1873 (36 & 37 Vict. c. 91))
Marine Mutiny (No. 2) Act 1813 (repealed)	54 Geo. 3. c. 31	14 December 1813
An Act for the regulating of His Majesty's Royal Marine Forces while on Shore. (Repealed by Statute Law Revision Act 1873 (36 & 37 Vict. c. 91))
Illicit Distillation (Ireland) Act 1813 (repealed)	54 Geo. 3. c. 32	17 December 1813
An Act to amend the several Acts for preventing the illicit Distillation of Spirits in Ireland. (Repealed by Statute Law Revision Act 1861 (24 & 25 Vict. c. 101))
Peace Preservation (Ireland) Act 1813 (repealed)	54 Geo. 3. c. 33	17 December 1813
An Act to continue, until the Twenty fifth Day of March One thousand eight hundred and fifteen, an Act, made in the Parliament of Ireland in the Twenty seventh Tear of His present Majesty, (Note: Peace Preservation Act 1787 (27 Geo. 3. c. 40 (I))) for the better Execution of the Law and Preservation of the Peace within Counties at large, as amended by an Act of the Thirty sixth of His Majesty. (Note: Civil Bill Courts Act 1796 (36 Geo. 3. c. 25 (I))) (Repealed by Statute Law Revision Act 1873 (36 & 37 Vict. c. 91))
East India Trade Act 1813 (repealed)	54 Geo. 3. c. 34	17 December 1813
An Ack for the further Regulation of the Trade to and from the Places within the Limits of the Charter of The East India Company. (Repealed by Lascars Act 1823 (4 Geo. 4. c. 80))
East India Trade (No. 2) Act 1813 (repealed)	54 Geo. 3. c. 35	17 December 1813
An Act to extend the Period for allowing Importations from and Exportations to the Places within the Limits of the Charter of the East India Company, in Ships not of British-built, until the First Day of January One thousand eight hundred and fifteen. (Repealed by Statute Law Revision Act 1873 (36 & 37 Vict. c. 91))
Customs, etc. Act 1813 (repealed)	54 Geo. 3. c. 36	17 December 1813
An Act to repeal the Duties of Customs payable on Goods, Wares and Merchandise imported into Great Britain from any Port or Place within the Limits of the Charter granted to The United Company of Merchants of England trading to The East Indies; and to grant other Duties in lieu thereof; and to establish further Regulations for the better Security of the Revenue on Goods so imported; and to alter the Periods of making up and presenting certain Accounts of the said Company to Parliament; to continue in force until the Tenth Day of April One thousand eight hundred and nineteen. (Repealed by Statute Law Revision Act 1861 (24 & 25 Vict. c. 101))
Police Magistrates, Metropolis Act 1813 (repealed)	54 Geo. 3. c. 37	17 December 1813
An Act for repealing an Act, made in the Fifty first Year of His present Majesty, (Note: Justice of the Peace, Metropolis Act 1811 (51 Geo. 3. c. 119)) for the more effectual Administration of the Office of a Justice of the Peace, in such Parts of the Counties of Middlesex and Surry as lie in and near the Metropolis; and for making other Provisions in lieu thereof; to continue in force until the First Day of June One thousand eight hundred and twenty, and from thence until the Expiration of Six Weeks from the Commencement of the then next Session of Parliament. (Repealed by Police Magistrates, Metropolitan Act 1821 (1 & 2 Geo. 4. c. 118))
City of London Militia (No. 2) Act 1813 (repealed)	54 Geo. 3. c. 38	17 December 1813
An Act for allowing a certain Proportion of the London Militia to enlist into the Regular Forces for the vigorous Prosecution of the War; also, a certain Proportion to enlist annually into the Regular Forces; and for completing the said Militia. (Repealed by Statute Law Revision Act 1873 (36 & 37 Vict. c. 91))
Exchequer Bills (No. 7) Act 1813 (repealed)	54 Geo. 3. c. 39	20 December 1813
An Act for raising the Sum of Five Millions, by Exchequer Bills, for the Service of Great Britain, for the Year One thousand eight hundred and fourteen. (Repealed by Statute Law Revision Act 1873 (36 & 37 Vict. c. 91))
Exportation (No. 9) Act 1813 (repealed)	54 Geo. 3. c. 40	20 December 1813
An Act to remove Doubts respecting the Payment of Drawback on the Exportation of French Wine in certain Cases. (Repealed by Statute Law Revision Act 1873 (36 & 37 Vict. c. 91))
Importation (No. 3) Act 1813 (repealed)	54 Geo. 3. c. 41	20 December 1813
An Act to continue until the First Day of July One thousand eight hundred and fourteen, an Act made in the Forty ninth Year of His present Majesty's Reign, (Note: Importation Act 1809 (49 Geo. 3. c. 8)) to suspend the Importation of British or Irish-made Spirits into Great Britain and Ireland respectively. (Repealed by Statute Law Revision Act 1873 (36 & 37 Vict. c. 91))
Destruction of Stocking Frames, etc. Act 1813 (repealed)	54 Geo. 3. c. 42	20 December 1813
An act to repeal an Act of the Fifty second Year of His present Majesty, (Note: Destruction of Stocking Frames, etc. Act 1812 (52 Geo. 3. c. 16)) for the Punishment of Persons destroying Stocking or Lace Frames, or any Articles in such Frames, and to make other Provisions instead thereof. (Repealed by Destroying Stocking Frames, etc. Act 1817 (57 Geo. 3. c. 126))
Purchase for Works at Portsmouth Act 1813	54 Geo. 3. c. 43	20 December 1813
An Act to vest in Trustees certain Messuages, Lands, Tenements and Hereditaments, for extending the present Lines and Works, and for erecting other Works and Buildings at and near Portsmouth and Hilsea, in the County of Southampton.

=== Local acts ===
Short title	Citation	Royal assent
Long title
Roads from Manchester to Rochdale, Bury and Radcliffe Bridge Act 1813	54 Geo. 3. c. i	6 December 1813
An Act to continue and amend Two Acts of the Thirty eighth (Note: Lancashire Roads Act 1798 (38 Geo. 3. c. xi)) and Forty third (Note: Manchester District of Road Act 1802 (43 Geo. 3. c. iii)) Years of His present Majesty, for more effectually repairing that Part of the Roads from Manchester to Rochdale, Bury and Radcliffe Bridge, all in the County Palatine of Lancaster, which is called The Manchester District; and for making and maintaining a new Branch of Road to communicate therewith.
Cheshunt Inclosure Act 1813	54 Geo. 3. c. ii	6 December 1813
An Act for altering and enlarging the Powers of an Act of His present Majesty, (Note: Cheshunt Inclosure Act 1799 (39 Geo. 3. c. 75 Pr.)) for inclosing Lands in the Parish of Cheshunt, in the County of Hertford.
Collingham to York Road Act 1813 (repealed)	54 Geo. 3. c. iii	10 December 1813
An Act for enlarging the Term and Powers of Two Acts of His present Majesty, (Note: Collingham to York Road Act 1771 (11 Geo. 3. c. 68)) (Note: Collingham to York Road Act 1792 (32 Geo. 3. c. 142)) for repairing and widening the Road from Collingham, through Wetherby, to the City of York. (Repealed by Road from Collingham to York Act 1826 (7 Geo. 4. c. xi))
St. Neots and Cambridge Road Act 1813	54 Geo. 3. c. iv	14 December 1813
An Act for enlarging the Term and Powers of Two Acts of His present Majesty, (Note: St. Neots to Cambridge Road Act 1772 (12 Geo. 3. c. 90)) (Note: St. Neots to Cambridge Road Act 1793 (33 Geo. 3. c. 151)) for repairing the Road from the West End of Saint Ives Lane, in the Town of Saint Neots in the County of Huntingdon, to the Pavement at the End of Bell Lane, in the Town of Cambridge.
Bryanston Square, St. Marylebone, Improvement Act 1813	54 Geo. 3. c. v	17 December 1813
An Act for the Improvement of Bryanston Square, in the Parish of Saint Mary le Bone, in the County of Middlesex.
Dorset Square, St. Marylebone, Improvement Act 1813	54 Geo. 3. c. vi	17 December 1813
An Act for the Improvement of Dorset Square, in the Parish of Saint Mary le Bone, in the County of Middlesex.
Montague Square, St. Marylebone, Improvement Act 1813	54 Geo. 3. c. vii	17 December 1813
An Act for the Improvement of Montagu Square, in the Parish of Saint Mary le Bone, in the County of Middlesex.
Sun Life Assurance Society Act 1813 (repealed)	54 Geo. 3. c. viii	17 December 1813
An Act to enable The Sun Fire Office Company to sue and be sued in the Name of their Treasurer, under certain Regulations. (Repealed by Sun Life Assurance Act 1889 (52 & 53 Vict. c. xvii))
Sun Fire Office Company Act 1813 or the Sun Fire Office Act 1813 (repealed)	54 Geo. 3. c. ix	17 December 1813
An Act to enable The Sun Fire Office Company to sue and be sued in the Name of their Treasurer, under certain Regulations. (Repealed by Sun Insurance Office Act 1891 (54 & 55 Vict. c. xcvii))
West of England Fire and Life Insurance Company Act 1813	54 Geo. 3. c. x	17 December 1813
An Act to enable The West of England Fire and Life Insurance Company to sue and be sued in the Name of their Secretary.
County Fire Office Act 1813	54 Geo. 3. c. xi	20 December 1813
An Act to enable the Company of The County Fire Office to sue and be sued in the Name of their Managing Director, or any other Director.
Imperial Insurance Company Act 1813	54 Geo. 3. c. xii	20 December 1813
An Act to enable The Imperial Insurance Company to sue and be sued in the Name of the Chairman for the Time being, or of any other Member of the Company.
Deritend Bridge Act 1813	54 Geo. 3. c. xiii	20 December 1813
An Act for altering and enlarging the Powers of an Act of His present Majesty, (Note: Deritend Bridge, Birmingham Rebuilding Act 1788 (28 Geo. 3. c. 70)) for rebuilding the bridge over the River Rea, at the Town of Birmingham, called Deritend Bridge, and for making other Improvements therein mentioned.
Road from Folkestone to Mudshole Act 1813 (repealed)	54 Geo. 3. c. xiv	20 December 1813
An Act for enlarging the Term and Powers of an Act of His present Majesty, (Note: Kent Roads Act 1792 (32 Geo. 3. c. 117)) for repairing the Road from Canterbury Lane, within the Liberty of the Town of Folkestone, to a Place in the Parish of Folkestone called Mudshole, and other Roads therein mentioned, in the County of Kent. (Repealed by Folkestone to Barham Downs Turnpike Road Act 1862 (25 & 26 Vict. c. vi))

=== Private acts ===
Short title	Citation	Royal assent
Long title
Langwood and Deanhead Inclosure Act 1813	54 Geo. 3. c. 1 Pr.	10 December 1813
An Act for inclosing Lands in Longwood and Deanhead, both in the Parish of Huddersfield, in the West Riding of the County of York.
Llanthew Inclosure Act 1813	54 Geo. 3. c. 2 Pr.	17 December 1813
An Act for inclosing the Commons of Wain y Gyfir and Allt yr Onow, in the Parish of Llanthew, within the Manor of Alexanderstone, and Mara Mota, in the County of Brecon.

=== Sources ===
- The Statutes of the United Kingdom of Great Britain and Ireland. Vol. 53 part 1: 54 George III. London: Joseph Butterworth. 1814 – via Internet Archive.
- The Statutes of the United Kingdom of Great Britain and Ireland. Vol. 53 part 1: 54 George III. London: Joseph Butterworth. 1814 – via Google Books.
- The Statutes of the United Kingdom of Great Britain and Ireland. Vol. 53 part 2: 54 George III. London: Joseph Butterworth. 1814 – via Internet Archive.
- Raithby, John, ed. (1814). The Statutes of the United Kingdom of Great Britain and Ireland. Vol. 5: 53 George III and 54 George III. London: Eyre and Strahan – via Google Books.
- Journal of the House of Commons. Vol. 69. London: His Majesty's Stationery Office. pp. 3–521.
- Chronological Table of and Index to the Statutes. Vol. 1: To the End of the Session 59 Vict. Sess. 2 (1895) (13th ed.). London: Her Majesty's Stationery Office. 1896. pp. 206–210 – via Google Books.

== See also ==
- List of acts of the Parliament of the United Kingdom
