= Alliance Assurance =

English insurance company (1824–1959)

- Industry: Insurance
- Founded: 1824
- Founders: Sir Moses Montefiore; Nathan Mayer Rothschild
- Defunct: 1959
- Fate: Merged with Sun Insurance
- Successor: Sun Alliance
- Headquarters: 1-4 Bartholomew Lane, City of London
- Key people: Samuel Gurney; Francis Baring; John Irving (MP); Benjamin Gompertz

The Alliance Assurance was formed in 1824. It merged with Sun Insurance in 1959 to form Sun Alliance Insurance.

== History ==
The Alliance was formed by Sir Moses Montefiore and Nathan Mayer Rothschild (married to sisters) with the intention of creating an insurance company with a larger capital and more influential directors than any before. As founding directors they brought in Samuel Gurney, Francis Baring and John Irving. To support the embryonic life business, the directors recruited Benjamin Gompertz (married to Montefiore's sister), now best known for his law of mortality, and the Alliance was launched in March 1824 with a capital of £5 million. One of the company's first achievements was to break the monopoly in marine insurance held by Lloyds and the two chartered corporations, London and Royal Exchange, via an act of Parliament, the Bubble Companies, etc. Act 1825 (6 Geo. 4. c. 91). As marine was not in line with the original prospectus, a sister company was formed, Alliance Marine Assurance, with directors in common. This too was launched in 1824, giving Alliance a complete coverage of the main markets – fire and marine insurance and life assurance. Alliance Marine was bought by Alliance Assurance in 1905.

One month after its launch, the Alliance ambitiously resolved to accept foreign insurance, life and fire from the principal towns of Europe, America, the West Indies and India. It is not clear how quickly the foreign business started but the Alliance immediately appointed agents around England and Scotland. Acquisitions played an important part in Alliance's growth. Its first domestic acquisition was made in 1847, the fire business division of the Insurance Company of Scotland, and a further dozen more around the country were made by 1890. Almost immediately there were four strategic overseas acquisitions: the Royal Canadian Fire Office of Montreal; the Union Fire Insurance of San Francisco; the Tasmanian Fire Insurance; and the Union Fire & Marine Insurance of New Zealand. There were further acquisitions before and after the Second World War, including the Imperial Fire and Life in 1902, Westminster Fire, Provident Life, and County Fire Office in 1906, and the National and Boiler & General in 1923. This was the last year covered by the Schooling history and it was not known what further acquisitions were made. Organic growth was not neglected and the Alliance started the major new line of accident insurance in 1907 following the Workmen's Compensation Act 1906.

New offices in St James's Street were designed by Richard Norman Shaw in the Queen Anne style, built in red brick with stone dressings and completed in 1883.

In 1959, Alliance Assurance merged with Sun Insurance to form Sun Alliance; this in turn merged with the Royal Insurance to produce the Royal Sun Alliance, later RSA Insurance Group.

== Coat of Arms ==
Alliance Assurance was granted a coat of arms by the College of Arms on September 1933.

Coat of arms of Alliance Assurance Company Limited

Adopted
14 September 1933
Crest
In front of flames proper issuant from a coronet of four roses argent, barbed and seeded proper, set upon a rim Or, two keys in saltire, wards upwards, sable.
Escutcheon
Argent, upon a rock issuant from the base proper, inscribed 1824 in gold numerals, a quadrangular castle also proper, pennons flying to the sinister from each tower gules.
Supporters
On the dexter side a lion guardant Or, resting the sinister hind leg on an escutcheon argent charged with a rod of Aesculapius gules; and on the sinister side a like lion resting the dexter hind leg on an escutcheon argent charged with an anchor sable.
Motto
Multi societate tutiores.

== Gallery of offices ==
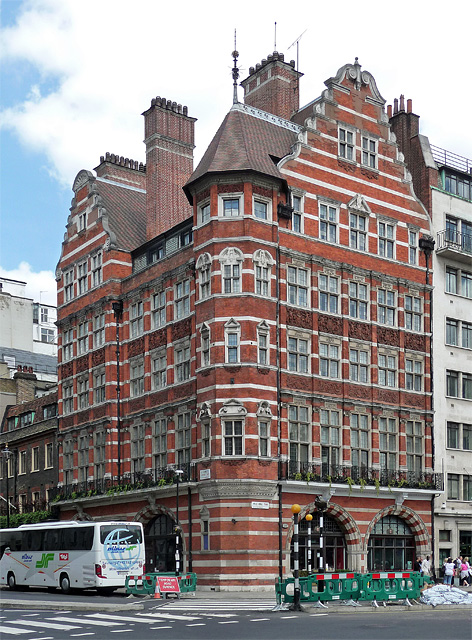
London west end (1895)

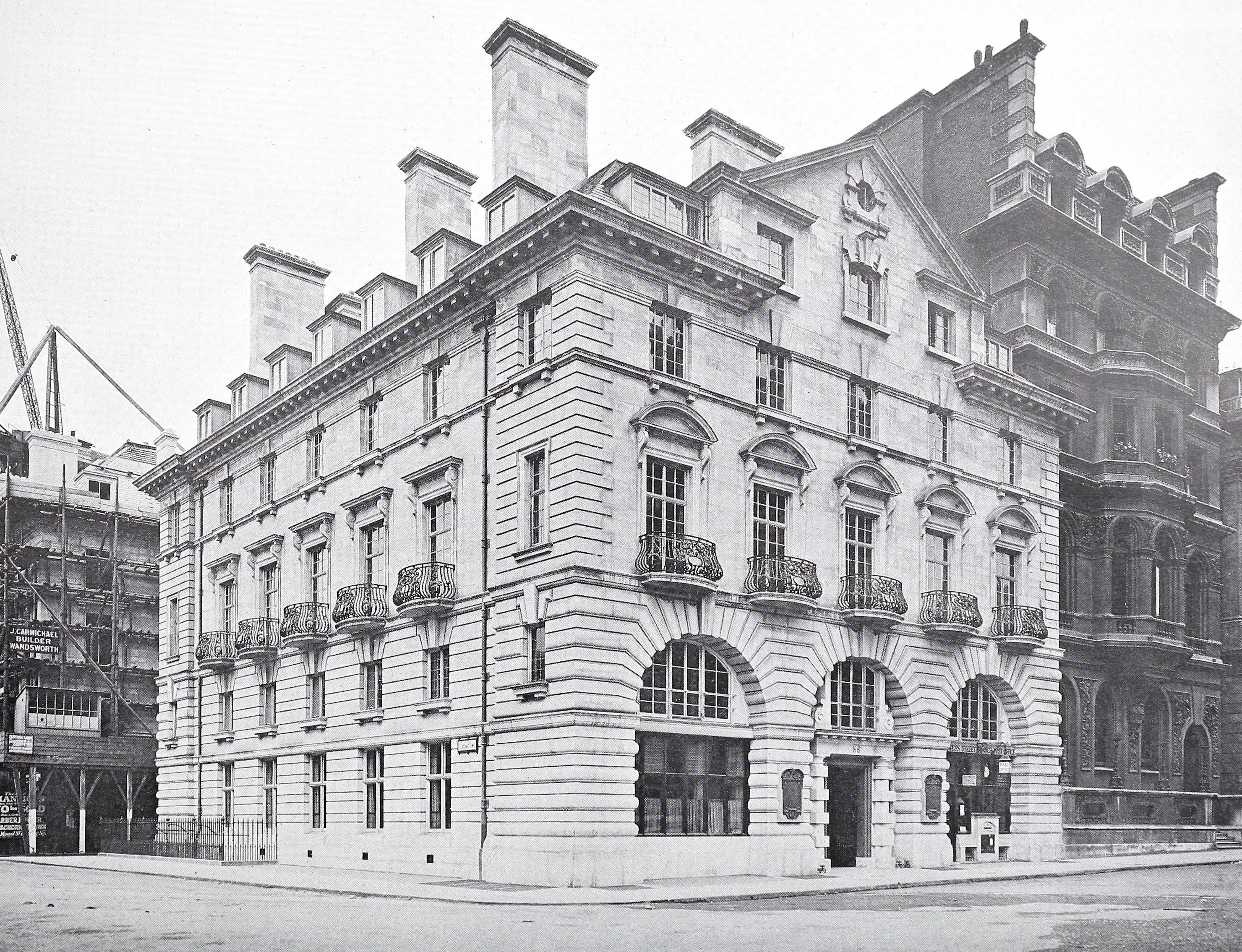
London west end (1907)

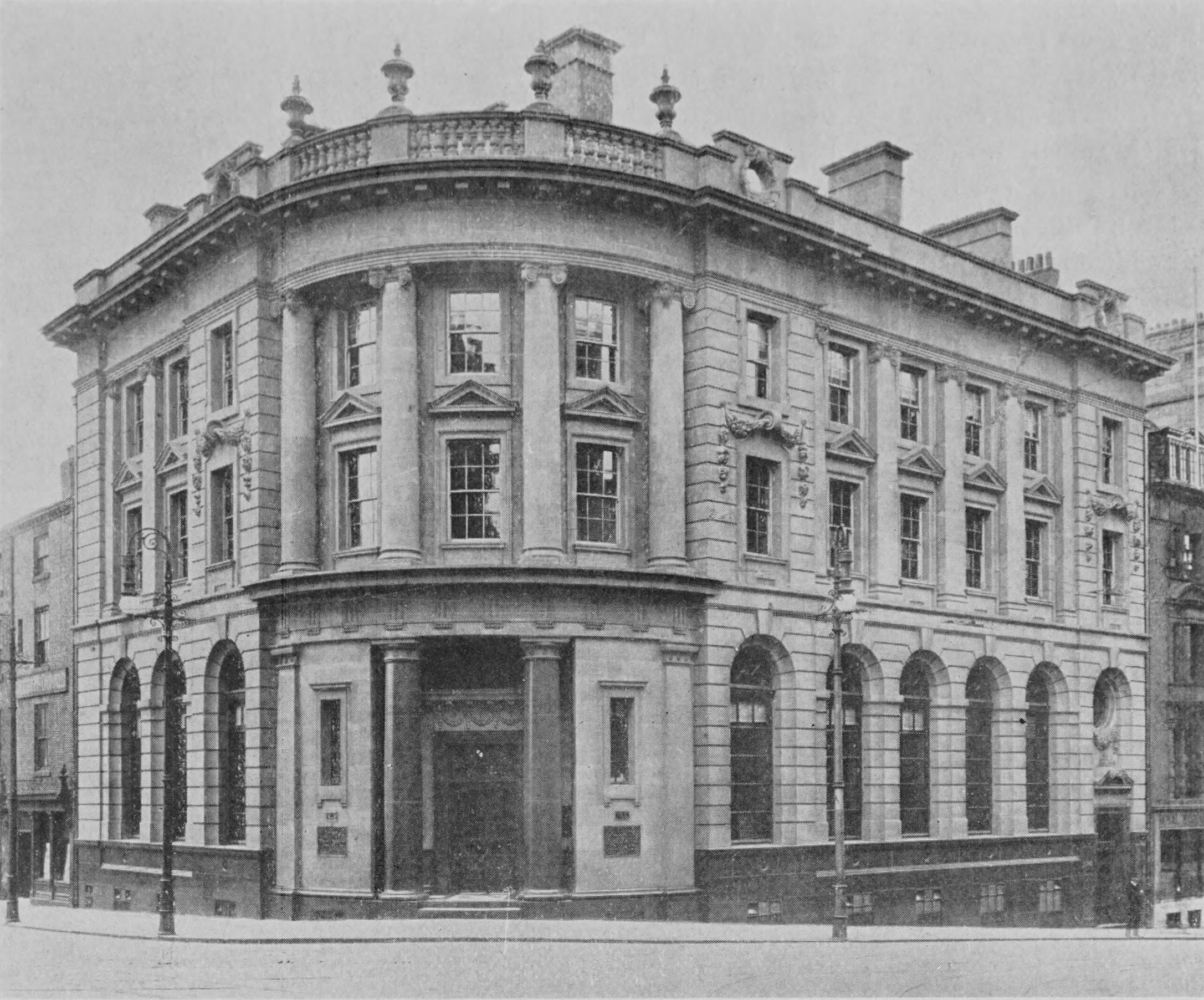
Newcastle

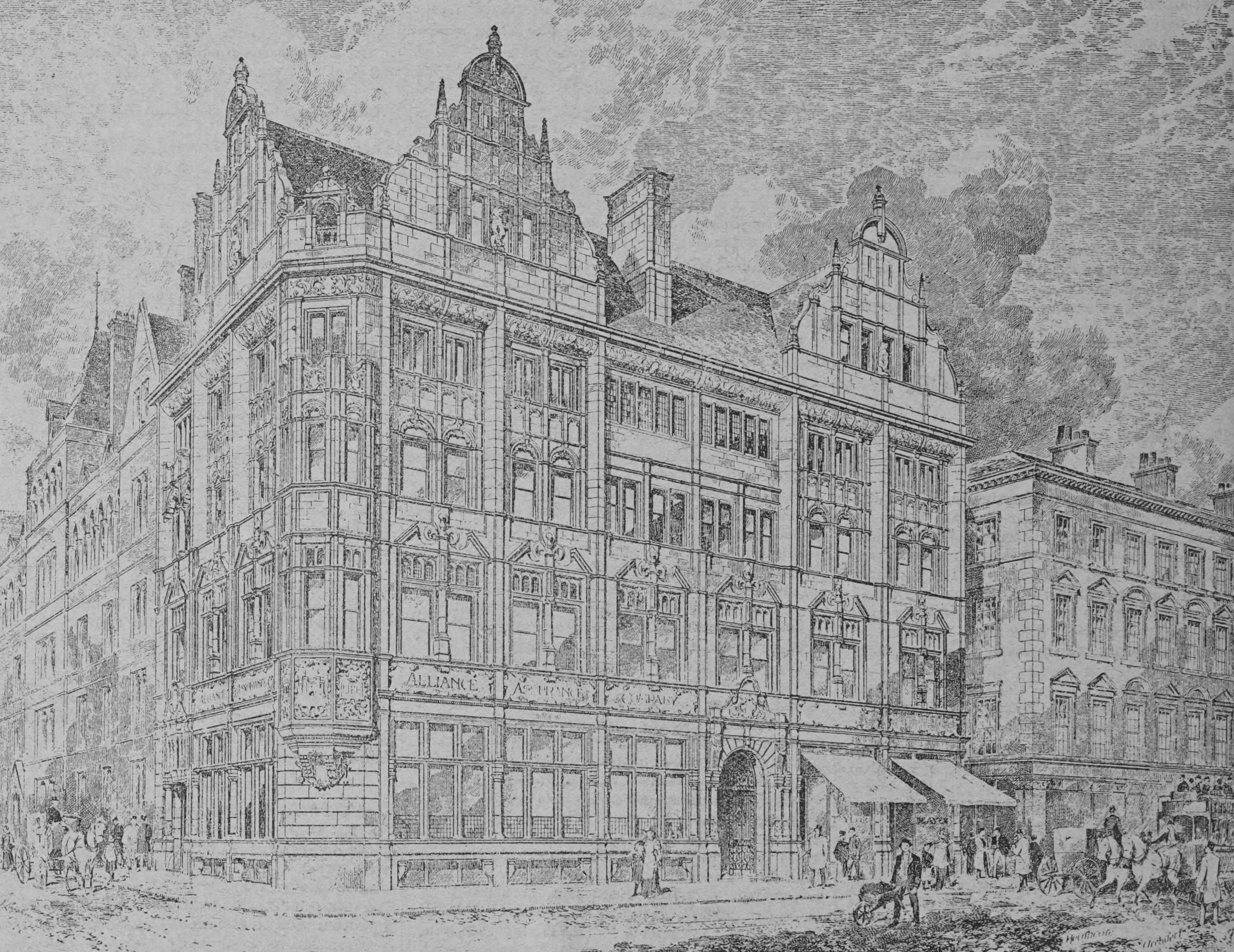
Manchester

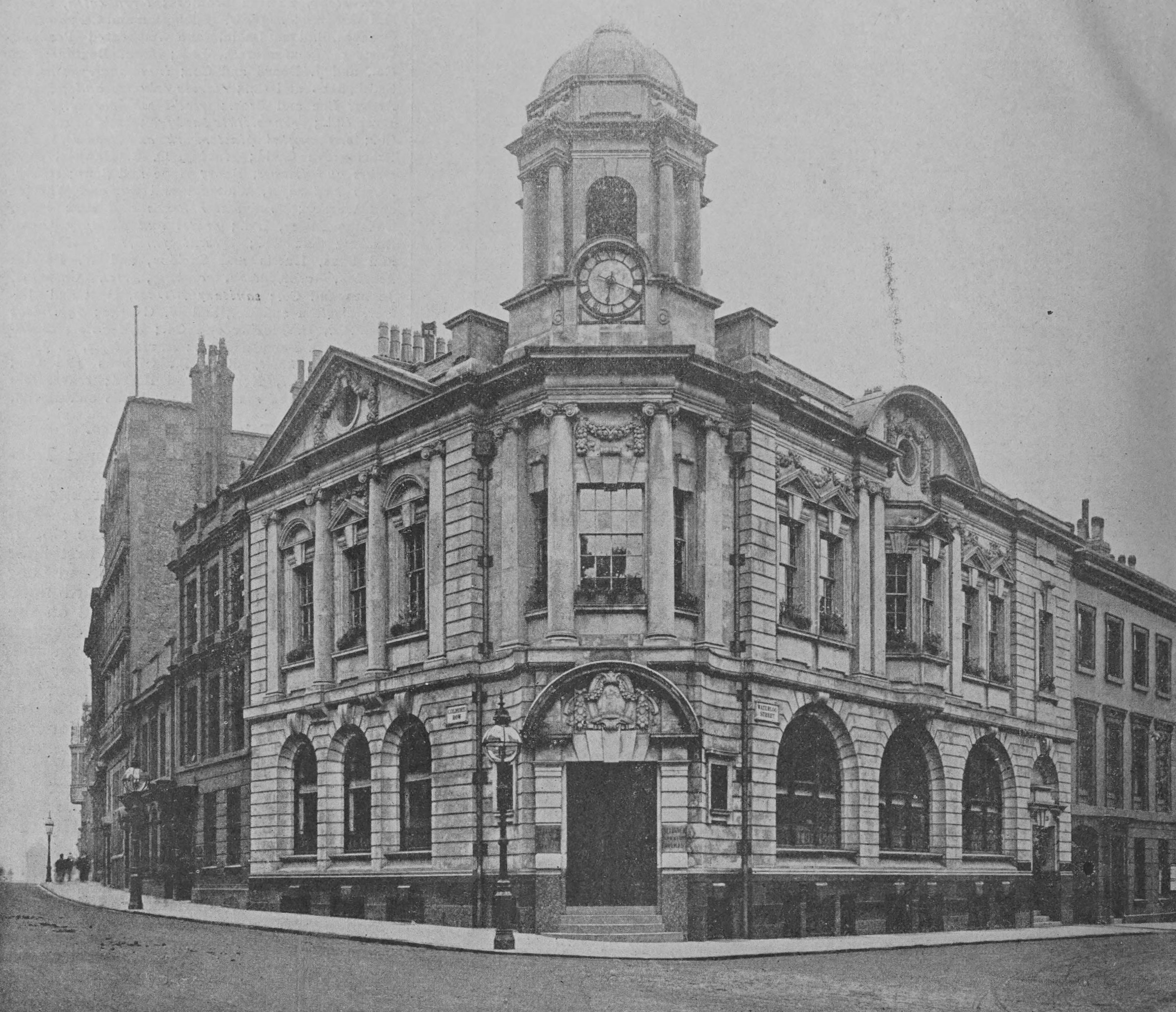
Birmingham

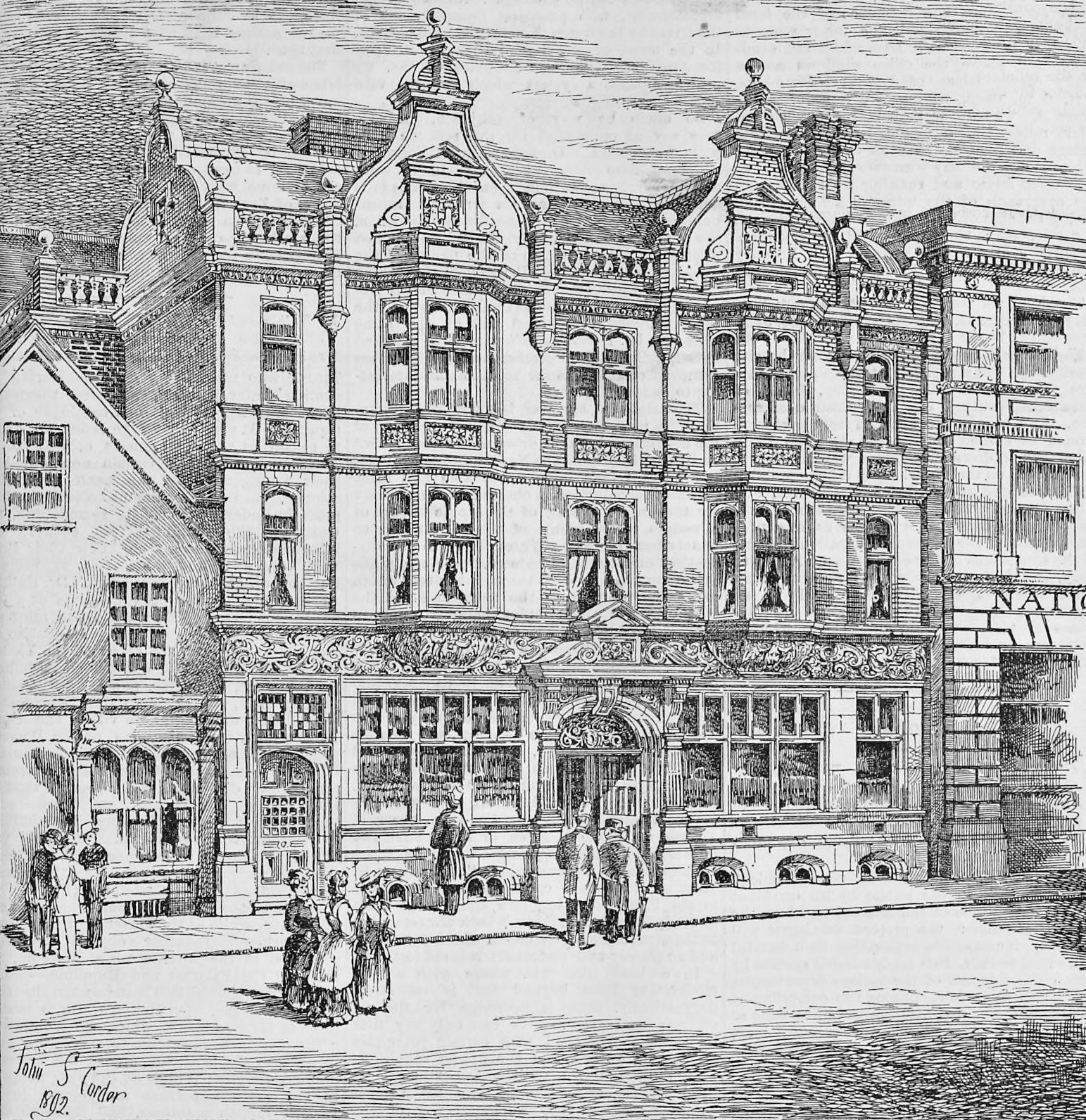
Bury St Edmunds
