= Will Gompertz =

British journalist (born 1965)

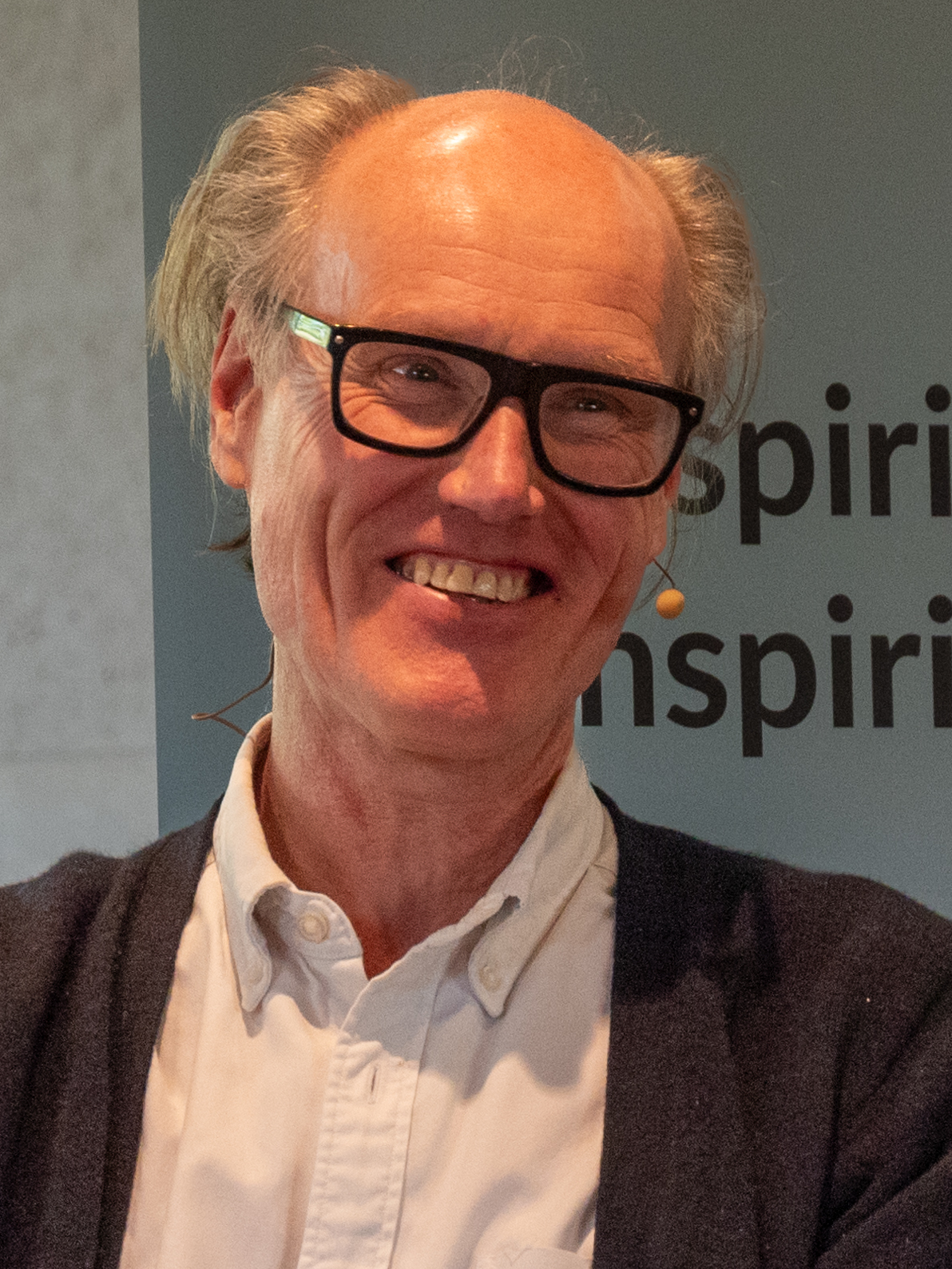
Gompertz at the 2024 Ealing Book Festival

William Edward Gompertz (born 1965) is an English journalist, author and art critic.

== Family and education ==
Gompertz is the son of general practitioner Hugh Gompertz OBE and a second cousin of Simon Gompertz, at one time personal finance correspondent for BBC News. He is a relation of Benjamin, Isaac and Lewis Gompertz. He was born in Tenterden, Kent, and attended Dulwich Preparatory School, in Cranbrook, Kent and then Bedford School. He was expelled from school aged 16 and left with no A-levels.

Gompertz married teacher Kate Anderson, daughter of Sir Eric Anderson, in 1993 and they have three sons and one daughter.

== Career ==
Gompertz was a director of Tate Media for seven years. He appeared in a show at the Edinburgh Fringe in 2009 called Double Art History.

He was the BBC's arts editor from 2009 to 2021. He became the Barbican Centre's Artistic Director from 1 June 2021. He became Director of London's Sir John Soane's Museum from January 2024.

Gompertz has written extensively for The Guardian and The Times newspapers. He is the author of What Are You Looking At?: 150 Years of Modern Art in the Blink of an Eye and Think Like an Artist.

Media offices
New title	Arts Editor: BBC News; 2009–2021	Position abolished
