= Guardian Assurance Company =

English insurance company (1821–1968)

- Type: Public
- Industry: Insurance
- Founded: 1821
- Defunct: 1968
- Fate: Merged with the Royal Exchange Assurance Corporation
- Successor: Guardian Royal Exchange Assurance
- Headquarters: 68 King William Street, City of London

The Guardian Assurance Company was a British insurance company based in London and formed in 1821 to offer both life and fire insurance. Through a combination of organic growth and acquisition it became one of the leading insurance companies. It operated as a mutual organization, meaning that it was owned by its policyholders rather than by shareholders. In 1968 it merged with Royal Exchange Assurance to form Guardian Royal Exchange Assurance.

== History ==
=== The first hundred years ===
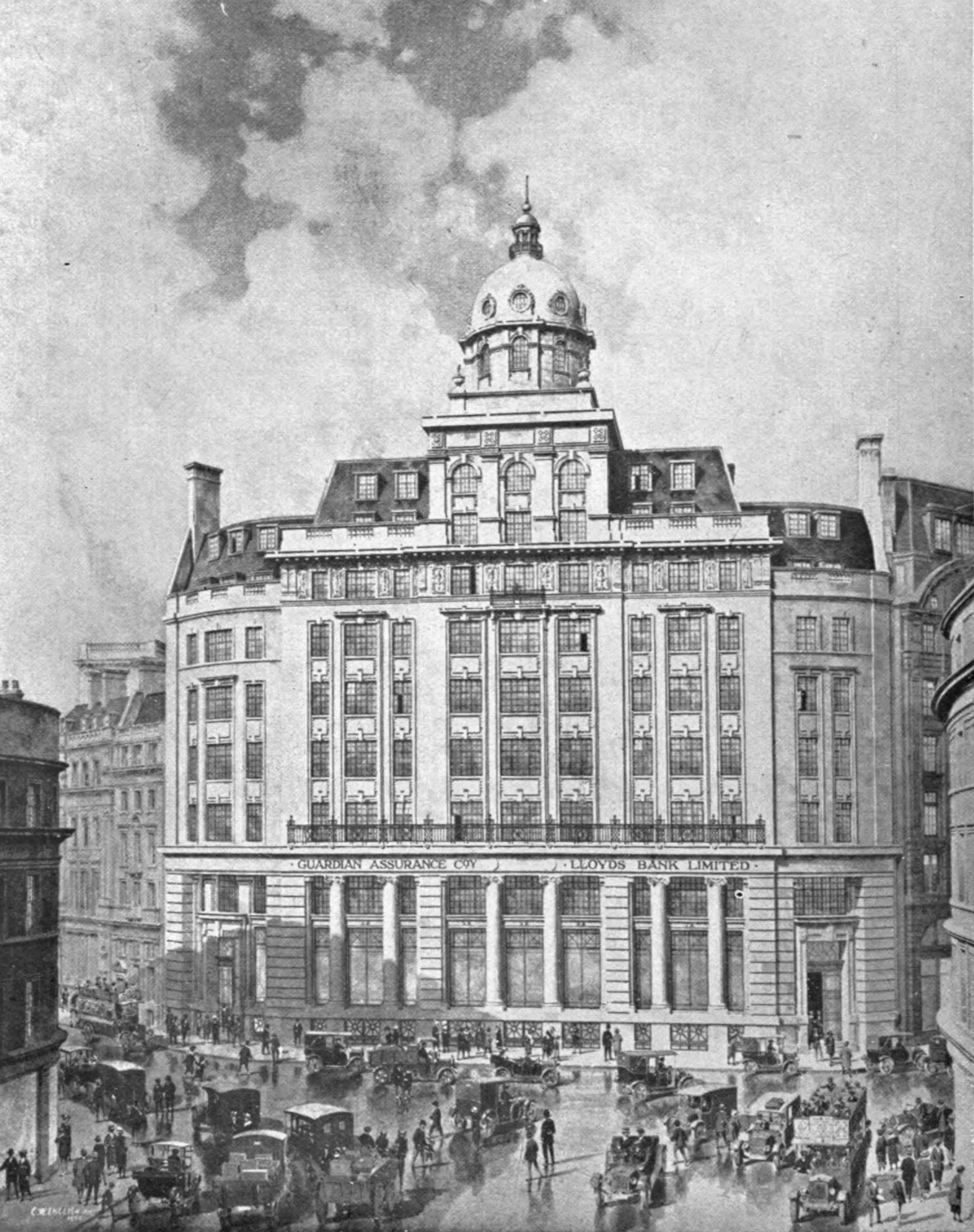
The 1922 head office at 68 King William Street designed by Campbell Jones, Son & Smithers (of Lloyds Bank) and Henry Lennox Anderson (of Guardian)

There are no records of the original meetings or the motivation of the promoters, but it is believed that there was a substantial involvement by bankers. The chairman, Stewart Marjoribanks, was an East India merchant; and the deputy chairman, Richard Mee Raikes, later became Governor of the Bank of England. A notice in The Times in November 1821 stated that the court of directors of Guardian Fire and Life announce that a general meeting of the subscribers would be held at the City of London Tavern on 10 December 1821 when the deed of settlement would be submitted for approval. The following February the directors announced that "the principles upon which this Institution have been founded have been adopted" and the subscribed capital was £1,500,000. One of the unexplained "principles" of, to use its full name, the Guardian Fire and Life Assurance Company, was that no shares were to be granted to persons resident in the metropolis (London) or within ten miles, except by permission.

Unlike most insurance companies at the time, the Guardian offered both fire insurance and life assurance from the outset, but it was life that made the greater contribution to profits. The important task of constructing mortality tables was entrusted to Griffith Davies; along with Benjamin Gompertz, Davies was considered one of the pioneers of life tables. The first task of the fire department was to establish its own fire brigade, but it was soon looking further afield. As early as 1822, foreign business was being considered. The directors resolved to avoid risks in America and the Levant, but did accept a proposal to insure a church in St Petersburg.

After the seven-year life fund valuation, the first dividends were paid in 1829. In the period from 1821 to 1860, fire profits of £79,000 compared with the £652,000 transferred from the life account. Life business grew rapidly, and by 1842 there were 4,079 policies in force, assuring £4.6 million. After that, new business declined rapidly "and apparently little effort was made". This malaise lasted until about 1880 when a branch and agency system introduced. In 1883 the Guardian bought the London and Provincial Law Assurance Society: the number of policies rose from 4,518 in 1879 to 7,192 in 1884; and by 1914 these had risen to 15,750. However, in the early 1860s, as the life business languished, the fire department began an active overseas expansion. In 1863, agencies were appointed in Canada and in 1868 agencies were opened in Colombo, Penang, Montreal, Nova Scotia and Russia. The first United States agency was opened in New York in 1869 but in 1894 the Guardian withdrew from that market. Acquisitions featured, and between 1890 and 1892 the Guardian bought three businesses in South Africa, one in France and one in Canada.

By the close of the 19th century, the Guardian was expanding the range of its non-life business. Following the Workmen's Compensation Act 1897 the Guardian opened an accident department. In 1907-8 it bought two plate glass insurance companies to enter the glass market. The one important area missing from the Guardian portfolio was marine insurance, but this was rectified in 1917 with the purchase of Reliance Marine – the only acquisition financed by the issue of shares.

Guardian Assurance Company's Act 1850
- Act of Parliament
- Parliament of the United Kingdom
- Long title: An Act for better enabling the Guardian Fire and Life Assurance Company to sue and be sued, and to alter certain Provisions of their Deed of Settlement, and to give further Powers to the Company.
- Citation: 13 & 14 Vict. c. xxv

Dates
- Royal assent: 25 June 1850

Text of statute as originally enacted

Guardian Assurance Company's Act 1866
- Act of Parliament
- Parliament of the United Kingdom
- Long title: An Act to enable the Guardian Fire and Life Assurance Company to reduce the Amount of their paid-up Subscription Capital; and to alter certain Provisions of their Deed of Settlement; and to amend "The Guardian Assurance Company's Act, 1850;" and to give further Powers to the Company and the Directors thereof.
- Citation: 29 & 30 Vict. c. ccxxv

Dates
- Royal assent: 16 July 1866

Text of statute as originally enacted

Guardian Assurance Company Act 1893
- Act of Parliament
- Parliament of the United Kingdom
- Long title: An Act to enable the Guardian Fire and Life Assurance Company as from the date of its registration as a limited Company to alter the form of its constitution by substituting a Memorandum and Articles of Association for its Deed of Settlement and to repeal the Acts relating to such Company and for other purposes.
- Citation: 56 & 57 Vict. c. xiii

Dates
- Royal assent: 29 April 1893

Text of statute as originally enacted

In 1893, an act of Parliament, the Guardian Assurance Company Act 1893 (56 & 57 Vict. c. xiii), allowed the Guardian to register as a company under the Companies Acts. It was renamed Guardian Assurance in 1902.

=== Recent mergers and acquisitions ===
In 1967 it acquired Union Insurance Society of Canton Ltd. In 1968 it merged with Royal Exchange Assurance to form Guardian Royal Exchange Assurance.
