= Pelican and British Empire Life Insurance Company =

British life insurance company

- The offices of the company at 70 Lombard Street photographed before the demolition of the building in 1915
- Formerly: Pelican Life Office, Pelican Life Assurance Company
- Company type: Private company
- Industry: Financial services
- Founded: 1797
- Founder: Phoenix Fire Office
- Defunct: 1984
- Fate: Acquired and merged
- Successor: Sun Alliance & London
- Headquarters: London, United Kingdom
- Products: Life insurance

Pelican and British Empire Life Insurance Company was a British life insurance company that operated between 1797 and 1984.

It was established in 1797 by Phoenix Assurance as the Pelican Life Office, later the Pelican Life Assurance Company, before merging with British Empire Mutual Life Assurance in 1903 to become the Pelican and British Empire Life Insurance Company. It operated until 1984 when it was acquired by Sun Alliance & London.

== History ==
The Phoenix established the Pelican Life Office in 1797, acquiring premises at 70 Lombard Street in the City of London to open its office.

The building had been commissioned in 1757 by merchant banker Sir Charles Asgill as the sole premises of his private bank, engaging the services of architect Sir Robert Taylor to design the building. However, a decade after Asgill's death and after the 1796 closure of his bank, it became an ideal location for Pelican. To adorn its building, Pelican added an allegorical sculptural group to the previously plain facade; the group was designed by Lady Diana Beauclerk and sculpted by John de Veere of the Coade Stone factory. The building was demolished in 1915, but the sculptural group is in the Horniman Museum, London.

To attract customers, the Pelican Insurance Company spent £375 annually on 1,500 railway posters. Life insurance for the London, although it had begun as far back as 1721, remained quiescent until the early decades of the 19th century, in contrast to the energetic efforts being made at the Pelican Life Assurance.

In 1901, Pelican possessed £1,296,331 in life funds, attracted some £300,000 in new sums assured and earned a total premium income of £121,779. The Pelican was a proprietary company with share-owners.

After 110 years of business, in 1907 Phoenix reabsorbed its own offspring, Pelican Life Assurance, at that time known as the Pelican and British Empire Life Office, and thus began its career as a composite insurer. Sun Alliance & London acquired Phoenix Assurance in 1984.

=== Archives for Pelican Life Assurance Company ===
The Phoenix archive collection includes nearly all the surviving company records, as well as papers of the Pelican Life Assurance Company, including the Pelican subsidiaries Star (ST), British Empire Mutual (BE) and Positive (PO).
