= Sun Insurance =

English insurance company (1710–1959)

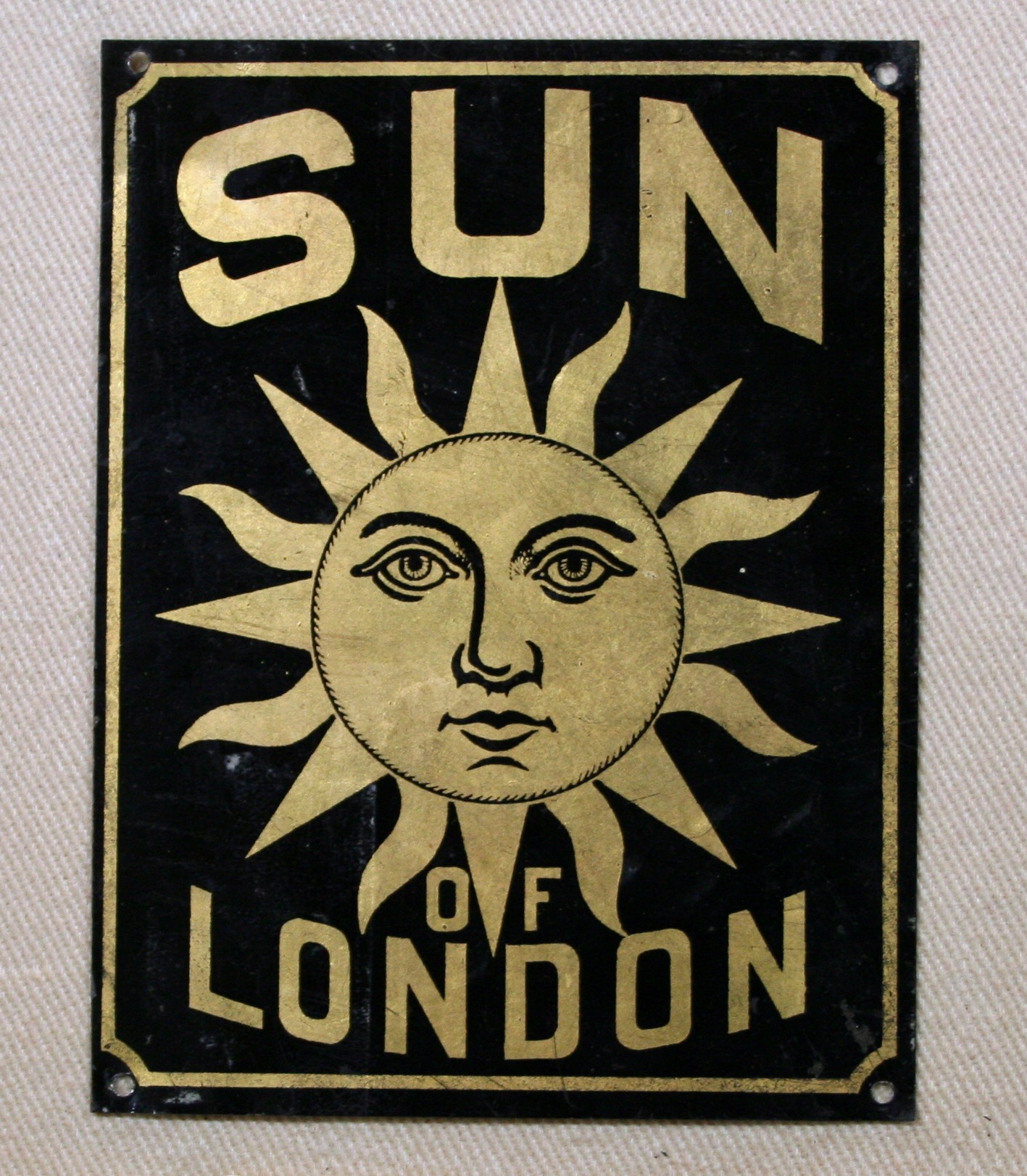
- Company fire mark

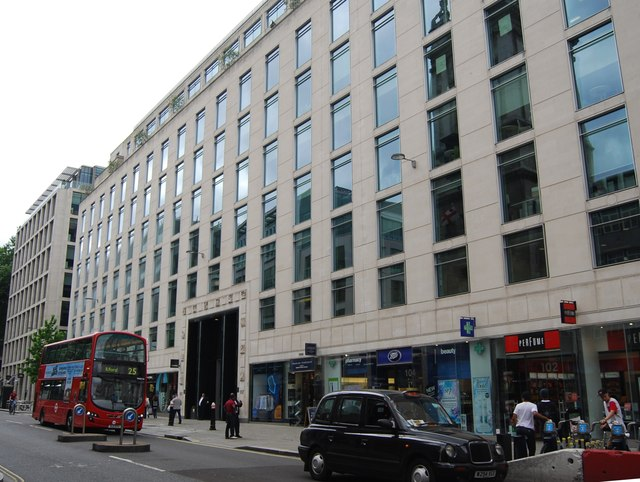
- 107 Cheapside, the former head office of Sun Insurance which featured signs of the zodiac round the main door
- Type: Public
- Industry: Insurance
- Founded: 1710
- Defunct: 1959
- Fate: Merged with Alliance Assurance
- Successor: Sun Alliance
- Headquarters: City of London

The Sun Fire Office, later Sun Insurance, was founded in London in 1710 and developed into a leading international insurance business. Sun Insurance merged with Alliance Assurance in 1959 to form Sun Alliance. In 1996, Sun Alliance combined with Royal Insurance to form Royal & Sun Alliance Insurance Group, later condensed to RSA Insurance Group.

== History ==
=== The 18th century ===
The Sun Fire Office was formed in 1710 when a group of 25 businessmen acquired an insurance company formed by one of them, Charles Povey, in 1708. Povey had been a pamphleteer and unsuccessful businessman. He had established a fire insurance company, the Exchange House Fire Office, in 1708 but after a takeover in 1710, he immediately fell out with his fellow directors and was forced to handover control. For the first decade the level of business was small and erratic until, in 1720, a takeover bid brought in a new board of directors; they raised fresh capital in order to finance an increased level of business. The first county agent was appointed in Nottingham in 1721. By 1740 there were 51 agents and, in 1786, 123 ranging throughout England and Scotland. By the 1790s Sun Fire was dominant among the fire offices with premium income of over £100,000.

=== The 19th century ===
Sun Fire Office Company Act 1813
- Act of Parliament
- Parliament of the United Kingdom
- Long title: An Act to enable The Sun Fire Office Company to sue and be sued in the Name of their Treasurer, under certain Regulations.
- Citation: 54 Geo. 3. c. ix

Dates
- Royal assent: 17 December 1813
Other legislation
| Repealed by | Sun Insurance Office Act 1891 |

Status: Repealed

Text of statute as originally enacted

Sun Fire Office Company Act 1827
- Act of Parliament
- Parliament of the United Kingdom
- Long title: An Act to remove Doubts as to the Validity of Life Annuities granted or purchased by the Sun Fire Office Company.
- Citation: 7 & 8 Geo. 4. c. xxii

Dates
- Royal assent: 12 April 1827
Other legislation
| Repealed by | Sun Insurance Office Act 1891 |

Status: Repealed

Text of statute as originally enacted

Sun Insurance Office Act 1891
- Act of Parliament
- Parliament of the United Kingdom
- Long title: An Act to repeal and re-enact with amendments the Sun Fire Office Acts 1813 and 1827 to make further provisions in relation to the Laws Objects Regulations and Capital of the Company to change the name of the Company and for other purposes.
- Citation: 54 & 55 Vict. c. xcvii

Dates
- Royal assent: 3 July 1891
Other legislation
| Repeals/revokes | Sun Fire Office Company Act 1813; Sun Fire Office Company Act 1827 |

Status: Current legislation

Text of statute as originally enacted

The early 1800s saw a slowdown in the rate of growth due to rising loss rates. In 1810, the directors decided to expand into life assurance but the original deeds only allowed for the acceptance of fire insurance. A separate company, the Sun Life Assurance Company, was formed and although it was legally distinct from the Fire Office, the two companies had identical boards of management. Before 1830, fire business was split equally between London and the provinces but by the 1880s more than 70 per cent was in the provinces. This was achieved by a huge increase in agencies, totalling over 800 by 1860 and over 1,200 by 1880. By then, Sun Fire was turning its attention to all forms of general insurance but, as was the case with life assurance, it was limited by the terms of its original deeds. This was overcome by a special act of Parliament, the Sun Insurance Office Act 1891 (54 & 55 Vict. c. xcvii) which also saw a change in name to the Sun Insurance Office.

=== International expansion ===
In 1836 the Sun made the decision to go overseas, its first target market being Germany, though the Great fire of Hamburg in 1842 "nearly strangled the infant overseas business at birth". In broad terms the development of overseas business before 1914 was primarily through agencies, although some policies were written from London. In the 1850, agencies were opened in the West Indies, South America, South Africa and the Far East. In the 1860s the emphasis was on France, Spain, Italy, the Ottoman Empire, Japan and the Philippines. Australia and New Zealand came in the 1870s followed by North America in the 1880s. The Sun was one of the last British companies to enter the United States on any scale but the region soon became the Sun's largest overseas market. This was effected by the 1885 acquisition of the Watertown Company, which operated in 30 states and through around 1,400 agencies. By the end of the 19th century, revenue from the USA equalled that of the home market. Canada was strengthened by the purchase of the Imperial Insurance Company in 1911.

=== The 20th century ===
The 20th century saw an increase in the range of cover. In 1907 the Sun set up an accident department, reflecting the growth of mass transport and machines. Sun Insurance had been absent from one of the oldest markets, marine insurance and in 1921 it formed a marine department. This was enlarged by its 1931 acquisition of the Elder's Insurance Company of Liverpool and its 1938 agreement with the Royal Exchange Assurance to operate a joint marine underwriting account. Organisationally, Sun Insurance became a public limited company in 1926 and for the first time shareholders' liability was limited by law. A new head office at 107 Cheapside was opened by the Lord Mayor, Sir Denis Truscott, in July 1958.

== Company histories ==
- Baumer, Edward. The Early Days of the Sun Fire Office. Sir Joseph Causton & Sons, 1910.
- Dickinson, P. G. M. The Sun Insurance Office, 1710–1960: The History of Two and a Half Centuries of British Insurance. Oxford University Press, 1960.
