= Griffith Davies =

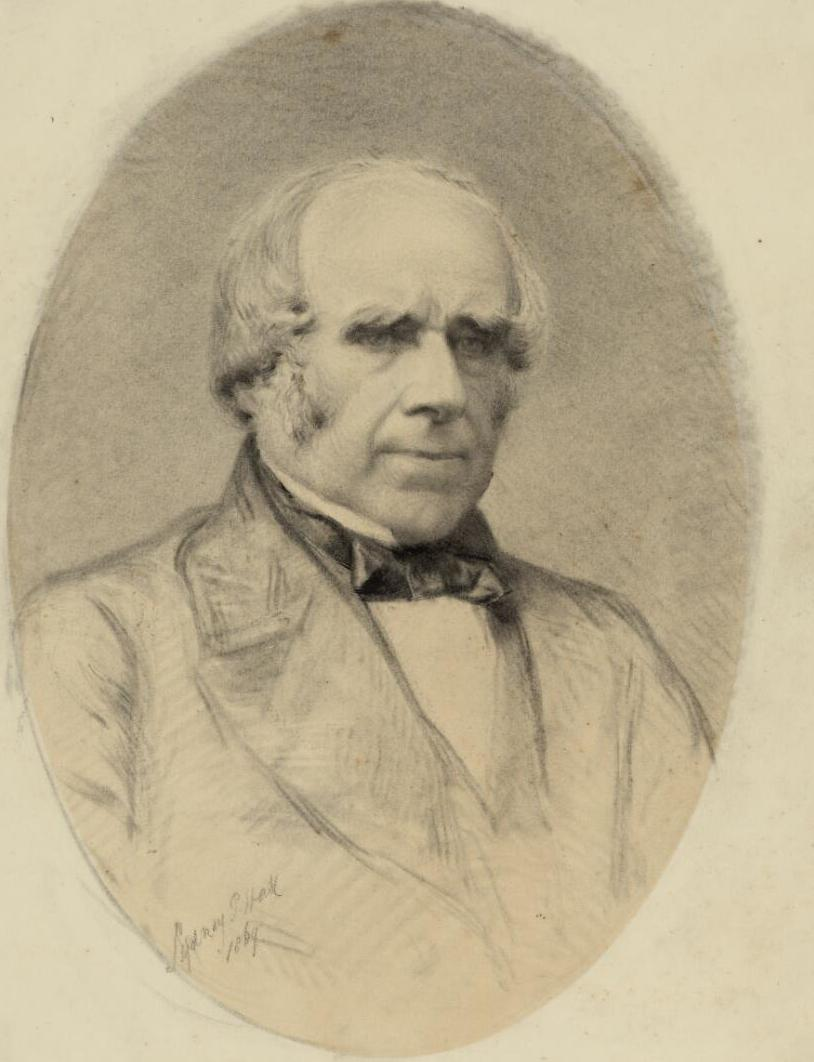

Griffith Davies (5 December 1788 - 25 March 1855) was a noted actuary.

== Early life ==
Davies, son of Owen Davies, farmer and quarryman (1761–1854), was born at the foot of Cilgwyn mountain, in the parish of Llandwrog, Caernarfon, on 5 December 1788. As most children at that time, he was taught to read and spell at a Welsh Sunday school. At the age of seven he commenced learning English at a school where he paid two shillings and sixpence per quarter. The poverty of his parents meant that he had to work for his living, and until 1808 he was a farm labourer, horse driver, and quarryman, obtaining at intervals some education and private study.

== Education ==
Having saved a little money he left Wales, and, arriving in London on 15 September 1809, attended a school to perfect himself in writing and grammar, but took no special interest in any subject except arithmetic.

== Academic career ==
In January 1810 he obtained an engagement at Mr. Rainhall's school as teacher of arithmetic, at a salary of 20l., and there commenced calculating the times of the eclipses and exhibiting their mode of occurrence by diagrams. He opened a school of his own in the summer of 1811 in James Street, Old Street; in the following year moved into a better house in Lizard Street, Bartholomew Square, St. Luke's, and joined the Mathematical Society in Crispin Street, Spitalfields, where the extensive library was of much use to him. Meanwhile, he corrected the press of a Welsh magazine then published, and wrote his ‘Key to Bonnycastle's Trigonometry’ (1814), which established his character as a mathematician.

After this he received private pupils, and among them a person connected with an assurance office desirous of studying the theory of life assurance. Davies had no knowledge of the subject, but soon mastered it. Sir John Franklin came to Davies after many years of service at sea to increase his knowledge of some of the higher branches of the science of navigation. Davies now gave instruction to several gentlemen connected with insurance associations, and was employed to do work for some of the offices. William Morgan, the actuary of the Equitable, furnished him with a certificate of actuarial competency. In 1820 he received the large silver medal of the Society of Arts for a most ingenious sundial constructed by him. The Directors of the Guardian Assurance Company applied to him for advice and assistance when drawing up their constitution, and he was engaged to construct the necessary tables. About the close of 1823 he was appointed the regular and permanent actuary of that company, an appointment which he held for nearly a third of a century. In the same year (1823) the Reversionary Interest Society was established, and for this company he constructed many elaborate and useful tables. In the first of his reports to the founders of that institution he announced that he had ‘ascertained upon indubitable evidence that a diminution had taken place in the mortality of Great Britain during the last hundred years.’ In 1825 he published ‘Tables of Life Contingencies, containing the rates of mortality among the members of the Equitable Society, and the value of life annuities, reversions, &c. computed therefrom; together with a more extensive scale of premiums for life assurance, deduced from the Northampton rate of mortality, than any hitherto published, and the progressive values of life policies.’ Davies was the remodeller of George Barrett's columnar plan of constructing mortality tables, and so arranged his tables that they may almost be said to be a new discovery (WALFORD, Cyclopædia, i. 618–23). Davies's fame as an actuary became widely known.

== East India Company ==
In 1829 the directors of the East India Company submitted the documents concerning the Bombay military fund for his investigation and report, and from this period up to 1851 he was constantly consulted regarding the various Indian funds. He wrote no less than twenty reports on these Indian funds, each containing extensive insurance tables. He was also engaged from time to time for the Bank of England. On 16 June 1831, on the recommendation of Mr. Benjamin Gompertz, he was elected a Fellow of the Royal Society.

== Ill Health and Death ==
From about 1847 he suffered from a series of attacks of bronchitis. On 5 December 1854 he was seized with a paralytic stroke, and died at 25 Duncan Terrace, Islington, London, 25 March 1855. He was married twice, and left a son and a daughter. He is buried in Abney Park Cemetery, Stoke Newington.

== Published works ==
- ‘Report and Valuation for the Madras Medical Fund, with numerous tables for its future guidance.’
- ‘Tables for the Use of Friendly Societies, by J. Finlaison. The tables compiled by G. Davies,’ 1847.
