= Atlas Assurance Company =

Defunct British life and fire insurance company

Atlas Assurance Company Limited
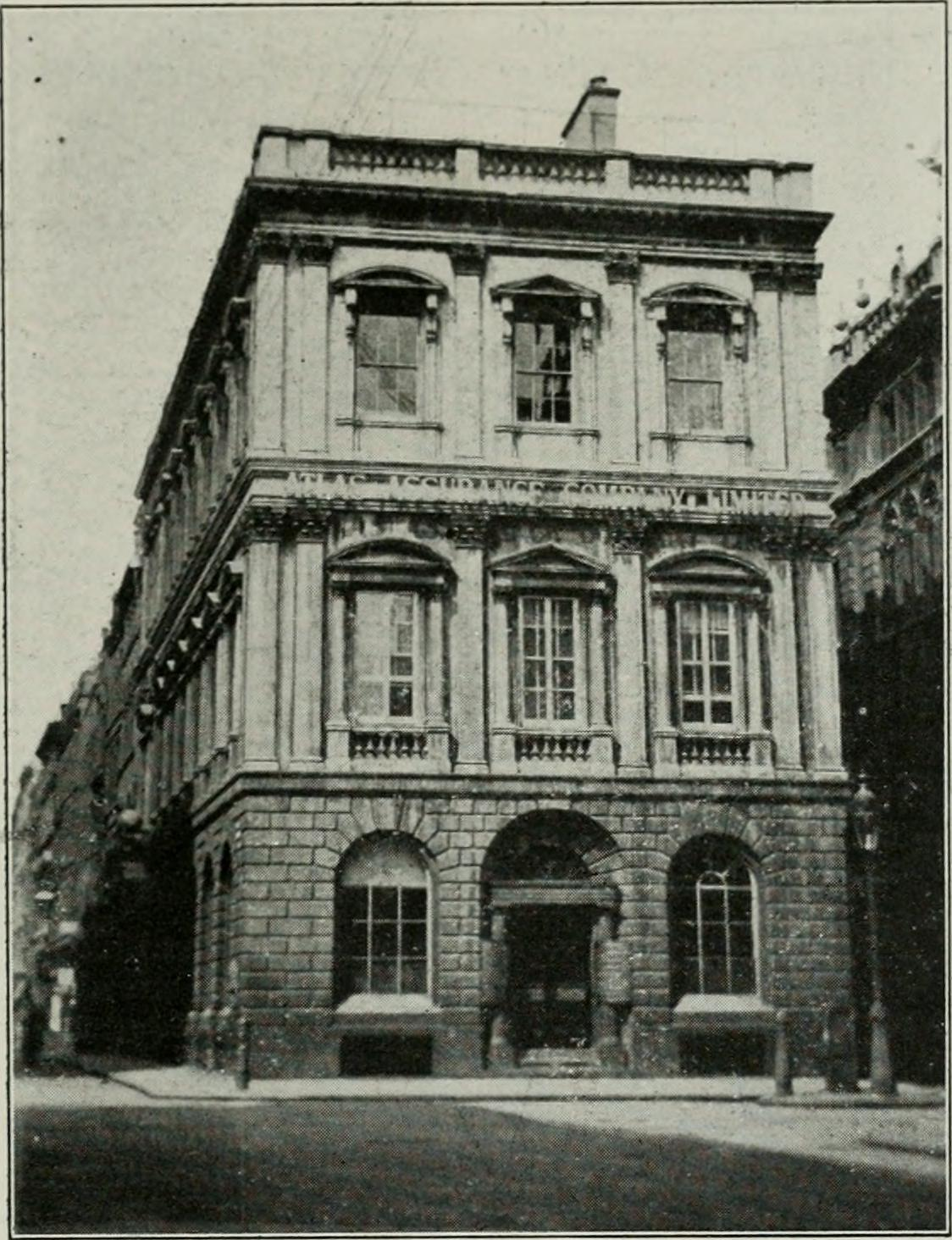
- Building of its headquarters in 1871
- Type: Insurance
- Founded: in 1808 in London, United Kingdom
- Defunct: 1959
- Successor: Royal Exchange Assurance Corporation
- Area served: Europe; North America; South America; Philippines

Atlas Assurance Company was a British life and fire insurance company established at the beginning of the 19th century in England. Its headquarters were in London, and it had several branches around the world, including Buenos Aires, Manila, Berlin and Washington, D.C.

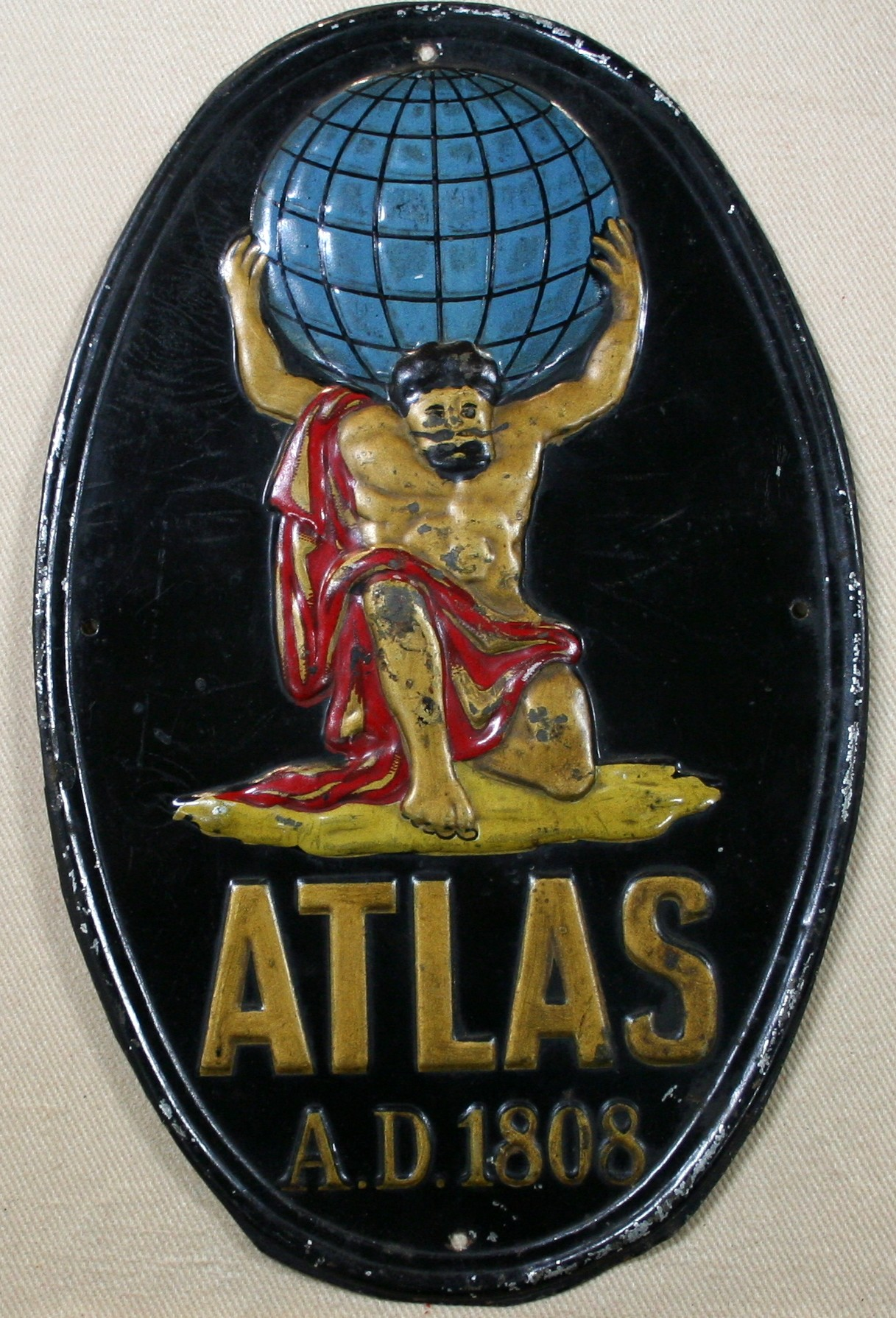
Fire mark for Atlas Assurance Company

It was established in 1808 in the city of London, and later expanded its branches around the world. This company worked until 1959, the year it was acquired by the Assurance Corporation.
