= John Crosley =

English astronomer and mathematician

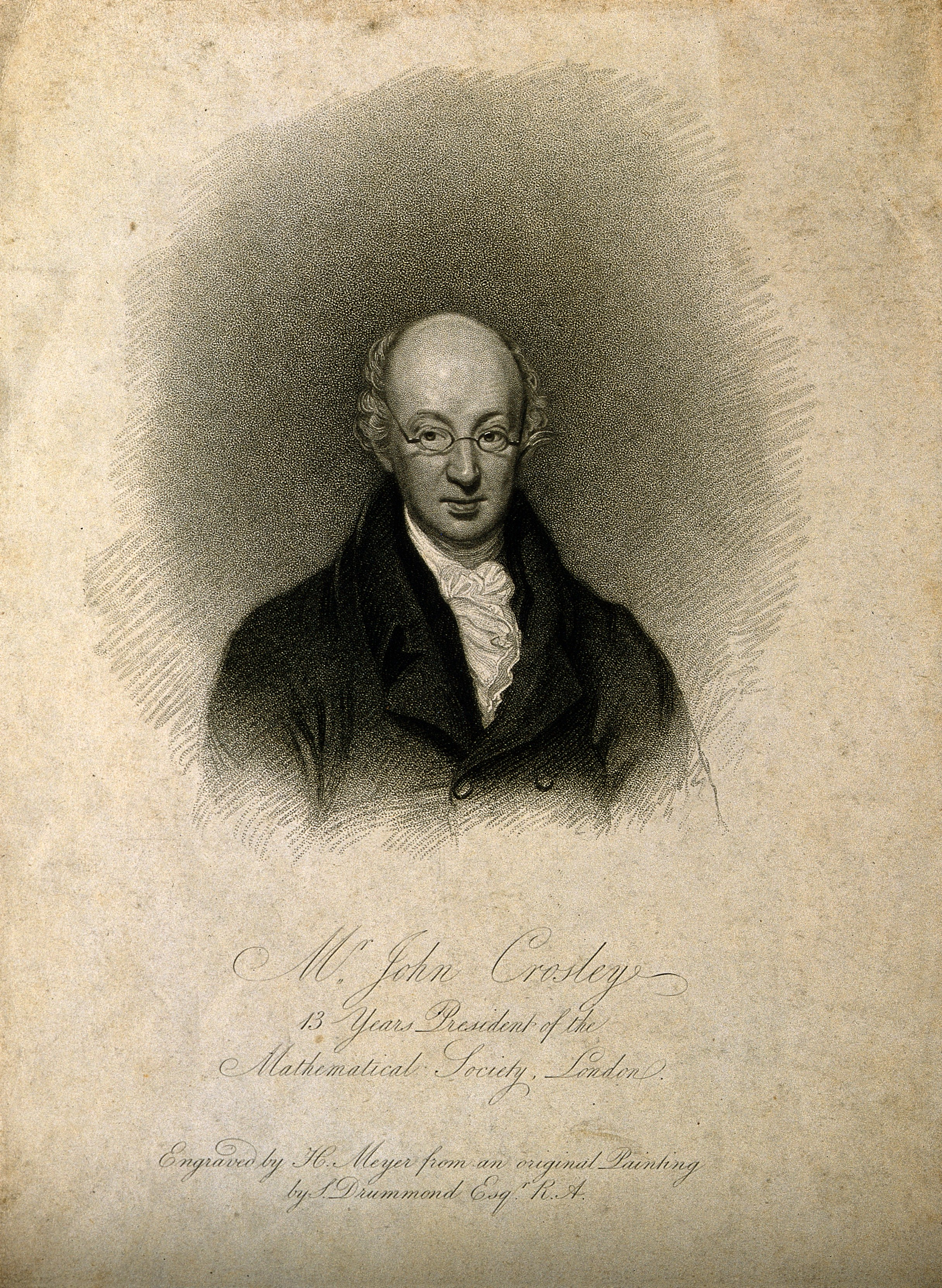
John Crosley (1813). Stipple engraving by H. Meyer after S. Drummond

John Crosley (1762–1817) was an English astronomer and mathematician who was an assistant at the Royal Observatory, Greenwich, a computer of the Nautical Almanac, an observer on maritime voyages of scientific exploration and a member and president of the Spitalfields Mathematical Society.

== Life ==
John Crosley was born in Yorkshire, but little is known of his life before his employment as an assistant at the Royal Observatory, Greenwich to the Astronomer Royal, Nevil Maskelyne. He was the Observatory's assistant in 1789–1792 and again in 1798. He was an observer appointed by the Board of Longitude between 1793 and 1798 to George Vancouver's expedition to the north-west coast of America, replacing William Gooch, who was murdered in Hawaii. During this voyage his ship, HMS Providence, was wrecked on a reef near Okinawa, and he returned to England on another sloop. His salary was £400 per annum, but he spent some years seeking compensation from the Board of Longitude for the loss of his books and instruments, ultimately receiving another £400 reward. As a Board-appointed observer he was required to use and care for the instruments with which he was issued. These included three timekeepers made by Thomas Earnshaw and one by John Arnold. He recorded all his observations and the problems encountered, including giving an account of the ship's wreck.

Crosley returned to the Royal Observatory for a few months in the summer of 1798. He was later appointed as observer to Matthew Flinders's circumnavigation of Australia (1801–1803), although ill health forced him to return in 1802, having only got as far as the Cape of Good Hope. On this voyage he made observations of position, particularly longitude, using both the astronomical lunar-distance method and timekeepers.

As well as acting as assistant to the Astronomer Royal at Greenwich, Nevil Maskelyne, Crosley was appointed by him as a computer of the Nautical Almanac, an important source of income from 1799 and for the rest of his life. He was a member of the Spitalfields Mathematical Society for 31 years and became its president from about 1800 until his death in 1817. He was recorded on a Society membership list as living at 54 North Street, City Road and, in a subsequent entry, as at 84 Leonard Street. An engraving of him that was included in a 1813 Mathematical Society Scrapbook records that he was then "13 Years President of the Mathematical Society".
