= HMS Providence (1791) =

Sloop of the Royal Navy

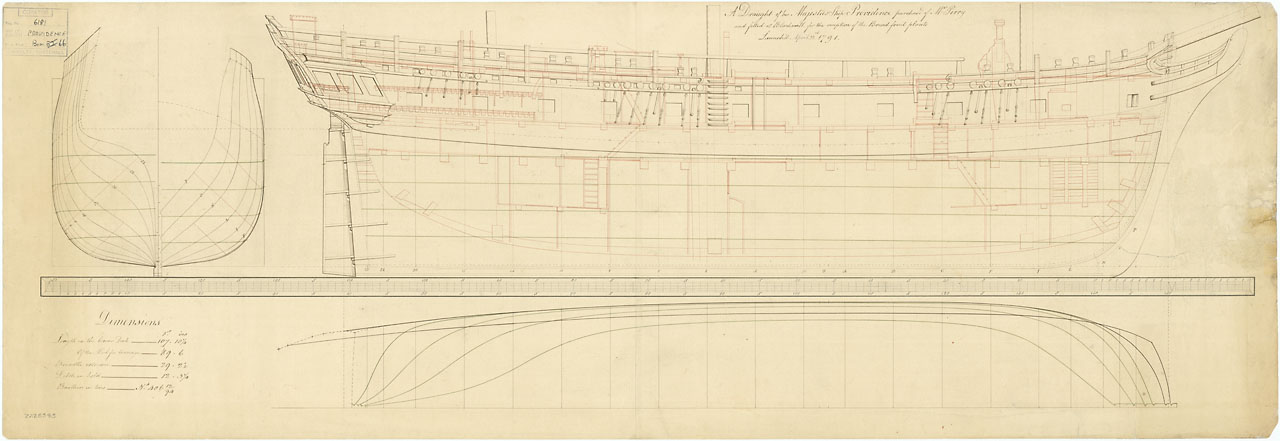
- Providence

History

Great Britain
- Name: HMS Providence
- Builder: Perry & Co, Blackwall Yard
- Launched: 23 April 1791
- Acquired: February 1791
- Commissioned: April 1791
- Fate: Wrecked 16 May 1797

General characteristics
- Class & type: Sloop-of-war
- Tons burthen: 406 (bm)
- Length: 107 ft 10 in (32.9 m) (overall); 89 ft 6 in (27.3 m) (keel)
- Beam: 29 ft 1 in (8.9 m)
- Draught: 7 ft 8 in (2.34 m) (standard); 10 ft (3.0 m) (deep)
- Depth of hold: 12 ft 3 in (3.73 m)
- Sail plan: Full-rigged ship
- Complement: 100
- Armament: 10 × 4-pounder guns (increased to 18 × 4-pounder guns in 1797); 14 × ½-pounder swivel guns

HMS Providence was a sloop of the Royal Navy, famous for being commanded by William Bligh on his second breadfruit voyage between 1791 and 1794.

== Construction and commissioning ==
The Admiralty purchased Providence on the stocks from Perry & Co, Blackwall Yard in February 1791. She was launched on 23 April 1791 and commissioned under Bligh that month. She was coppered at Woolwich for the sum of £1,267, and then again at Deptford for £3,981.

== Second Breadfruit Voyage ==
Rated as a sixth rate, Providence sailed for the Pacific on 2 August 1791 on Bligh's Second Breadfruit Voyage. Bligh completed a mission to collect breadfruit trees and other botanical specimens from the Pacific, which he transported to the West Indies. Specimens were given to the Saint Vincent and the Grenadines Botanic Gardens. Providence returned to Britain in August 1793, having been re-rated as a sloop on 30 September 1793. Serving as midshipman on board was Matthew Flinders. Then a teenager, later in his career as a captain, Flinders would determine that Van Diemen’s Land (Tasmania) was an island, would be the first to circumnavigate Australia, and be the first to call it Australia. This voyage was Flinders' first direct association with the island continent. In Adventure Bay, Tasmania, third lieutenant George Tobin made the first European drawing of an echidna.

== Vancouver Expedition ==
Providence underwent another refit at Woolwich and was recommissioned in October 1793 under the command of Commander William Robert Broughton. Broughton was ordered to rejoin the Vancouver Expedition.

Providence was at Plymouth on 20 January 1795 and so shared in the proceeds of the detention of the Dutch naval vessels, East Indiamen, and other merchant vessels that were in port on the outbreak of war between Britain and the Netherlands.

Providence departed Britain on 15 February 1795. Reaching Monterrey long after the expedition made its final departure, Broughton decided (correctly) that Vancouver would not have left his surveying task unfinished and departed to chart the coast of east Asia.

In the course of his explorations, he named Caroline Island Carolina (which later became "Caroline") "in compliment to the daughter of Sir Philip Stephens of the Admiralty." This name superseded that given by Pedro Fernández de Quirós, a Portuguese explorer sailing on behalf of Spain; his account names the island "San Bernardo."

Providence voyaged to Asia as the crew surveyed the coast of Hokkaidō Muroran before wintering at Macau in August 1796. There Broughton purchased a small schooner, which proved providential when on 16 May 1797 Providence was wrecked when she struck a coral reef at the northwestern tip of Yabiji, a reef group in the Miyako Islands north of Miyako-jima and south of Okinawa, flooded from the bottom, and sank. The wreck is described by the ship's astronomer John Crosley in a passage copied from the ship's log book. Broughton and his crew continued the mission in the schooner, exploring northeast Asia, and returned home in February 1799.

After the wreck, Western nautical charts began to refer to Yabiji as "Providence Reef."

== Wreck ==
In 2008, a diving survey conducted by the Okinawa Prefectural Buried Cultural Properties Center found the remains of a foreign ship, believed to those of Providence, in Yabiji. Iron ingots believed to be cargo or belongings of Providence′s crew, ceramics from China and Europe, glass bottles, and glass beads have been discovered at the shipwreck site.

== See also ==
- European and American voyages of scientific exploration

== Bibliography ==
- Colledge, J. J.; Warlow, Ben (2006) [1969]. Ships of the Royal Navy: The Complete Record of All Fighting Ships of the Royal Navy from the 15th Century to the Present (3rd Rev ed.). London: Chatham Publishing. ISBN 978-1-86176-281-8. OCLC 67375475.
- Winfield, Rif, British Warships of the Age of Sail 1714–1792: Design, Construction, Careers and Fates, pub Seaforth, 2007, ISBN 1-86176-295-X
