= Spitalfields Mathematical Society =

Defunct London-based learned society for mathematics

- Merged into: Royal Astronomical Society
- Formation: 1717; 309 years ago
- Founder: Joseph Middleton
- Founded at: Monmouth's Head, Spitalfields
- Dissolved: 1846; 180 years ago
- Type: Mathematical society
- Purpose: Education
- Location: Spitalfields, London, United Kingdom

The Spitalfields Mathematical Society was a learned society primarily for working class manual labourers founded in 1717 by Joseph Middleton and based in Spitalfields. Middleton was a retired mariner who had worked as a teacher of mathematics and a marine surveyor who wished to teach the mathematics of navigation to sailors.

== Membership ==
Members of the Society were drawn from artisans and craftsmen such as weavers, apothecaries, brewers, braziers, bakers, bricklayers, ironmongers, stockbrokers, and makers of optical and mathematical instruments. Well-known members included John Canton, John Dollond, Thomas Simpson, John Crosley, John Tatum, Francis Baily, and Benjamin Gompertz.

The Society was originally established to allow for a maximum number of 64 members – the square of eight. This was reduced to the square of seven in 1735 and then increased back to the square of eight in 1783. By 1804, the maximum number of members was the square of nine. After this, membership began dropping throughout the first half of the 19th century. Membership was 54 in 1839, 30 in 1841, and only 19 by 1845.

== Location ==
The Society had its first meetings in the Monmouth's Head, a public house on Monmouth Street in the Spitalfields district of London. In 1725 the Society moved to the White Horse on Wheeler Street. This was followed by a move to Ben Johnson's Head on Woodseer Street a decade later. In 1793, the society moved again to 36/36a Crispin Street in a large room that had originally been a Huguenot chapel. The building has since been demolished and the site is now a part of Spitalfields Market. Finally, due to financial difficulties, the Society moved out of the building on Crispin Street in 1843 and relocated to 9 Devonshire Street in Bishopsgate.

== Articles and items ==
The Society established 27 Articles as its constitution. Article II established that the Society would meet on Saturday evenings between the hours of 7 and 10pm each week and each member would pay fourpence for entry. Articles III and IV stated that between the hours of 8 and 9pm a period of mathematical problem solving would be undertaken in silence, with a fine of one shilling issued for anyone breaking the silence.

The Society eventually amassed a library of around 4000 volumes. One particular book to be given the catalogue number of 1 was 'A Course of Mathematics' by Joseph Middleton, the founder of the Society.

== Demise and legacy ==
The Society began giving public lectures in 1799–1800 for which it charged an admission on the door. Informers accused the Society of receiving funds for unlicensed entertainment and a legal challenge followed. The Society members raised £254 as a legal defence fund and a member called Mr Fletcher – a solicitor by profession – provided the defence for the Society. Mr Fletcher did not take a fee but £43 of expenses were incurred. The Society won the case but future attendance at the lectures was significantly diminished.

By 1843, as well as having to move to smaller premises because of increasing financial trouble, the Society also sold £70 worth of instrumentation.

The final president of the Society Benjamin Gompertz, along with Dr John Lee and J. J. Downes, were all members of both the Spitalfields Society and the Royal Astronomical Society. At the Council of the Royal Astronomical Society on 9 May 1845, Dr Lee suggested to the Council that due to the dwindling membership of the Spitalfields Society, the Royal Astronomical Society should offer lifetime membership to the remaining 19 members and, for that, the Spitalfields Society would transfer ownership of its library. Gompertz was also the only person to have been member of both the Spitalfields Mathematical Society and the London Mathematical Society.

The Society was subsequently merged with the Royal Astronomical Society in 1846, which acquired its records. Those records were passed on to the London Mathematical Society in the 1930s, were lost at some point either before or during the Second World War. The name lives on in the "Spitalfields Days" organised by, among others, the Isaac Newton Institute, Cambridge, the Mathematics Research Centre, Warwick, and the International Centre for Mathematical Sciences, Edinburgh.
