= Phoenix Assurance =

English insurance company (1782–1984)

- Type: Public
- Industry: Insurance
- Founded: 1782
- Defunct: 1984
- Fate: Acquired by Sun Alliance
- Headquarters: 5 King William Street, City of London

The Phoenix Assurance Company Limited was an English insurance company that existed from 1782 to 1984.

== History ==
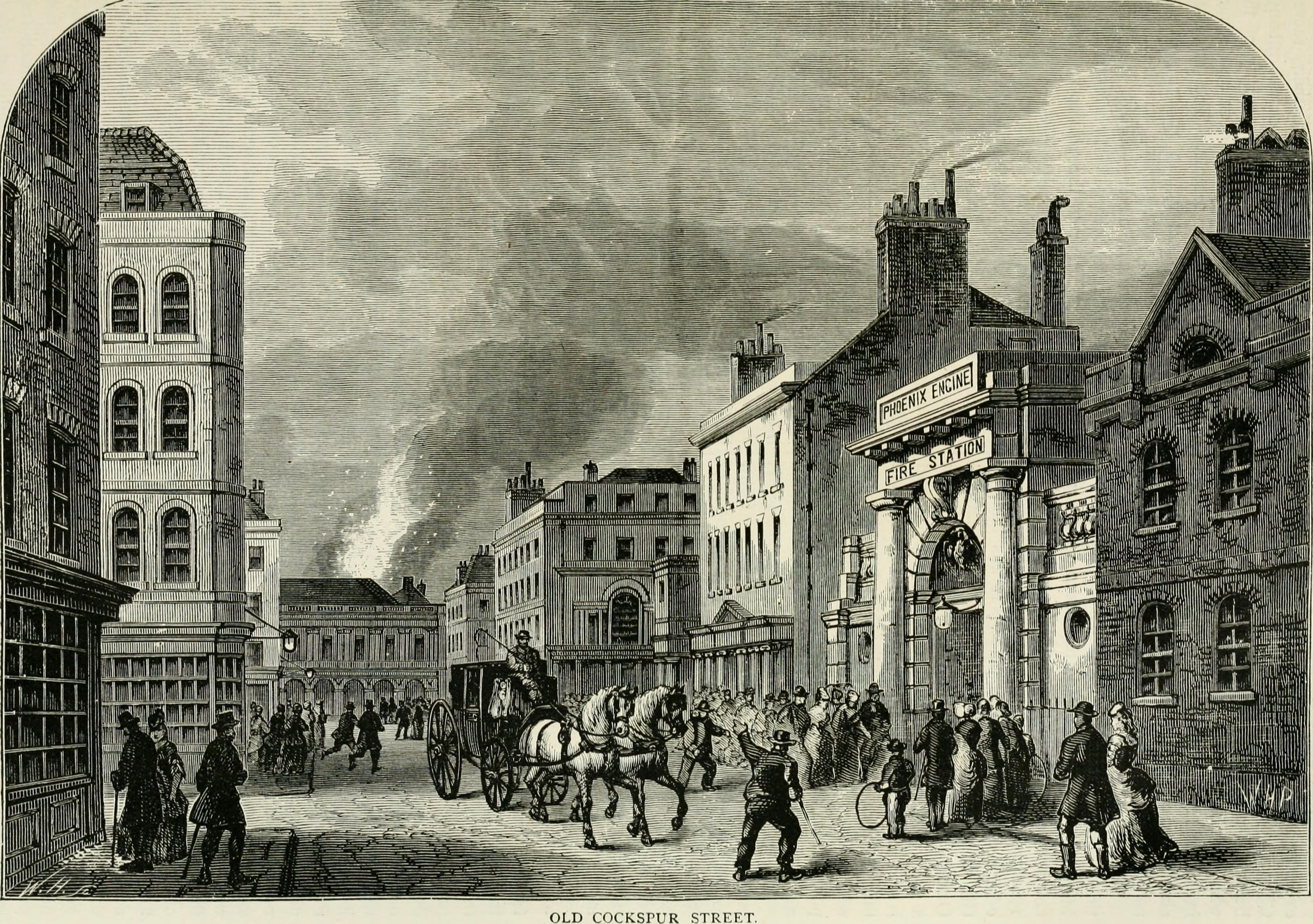
The Phoenix fire station in Cockspur Street, 1873

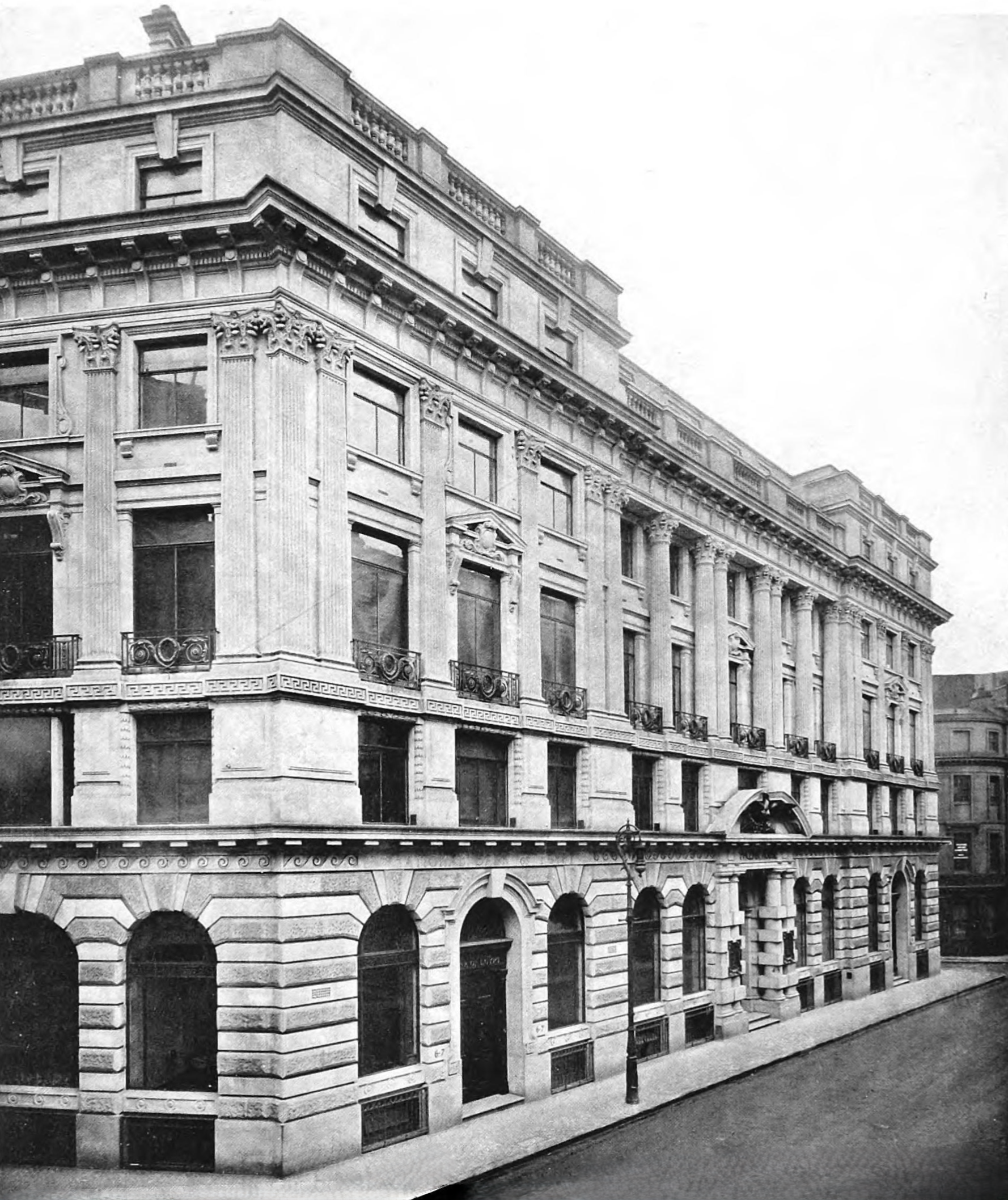
Phœnix House at 5 King William Street in London, designed by John Macvicar Anderson and Henry Lennox Anderson

The company was established in London in 1782. At that time, the company employed red-coated attendants clattering to the fires of London on horse-drawn tenders.

The Phoenix figured in case law. In 1796, the company refused to pay damages awarded of £3,000 (2021: £240,000) following a 1792 fire at a house in Tavistock Street, London. Phoenix claimed that the owners had failed to obtain a certificate from the ministers and churchwardens of the parish affirming the good character of the victims. Phoenix issued a writ of error to appeal against the original decision.

Phoenix diversified into life insurance, establishing the Pelican Life Office in 1797. In 1907 Phoenix reabsorbed Pelican Life Assurance, at that time known as the Pelican and British Empire Life Office, becoming a composite insurer.

The company built a new head office at 3-7 King William Street, erected in 1915, on a design by John Macvicar Anderson and his son Henry Lennox Anderson. It was known as Phoenix House while the seat of the company from 1915 to 1983; the name later went to another building at No. 18 in the same street.

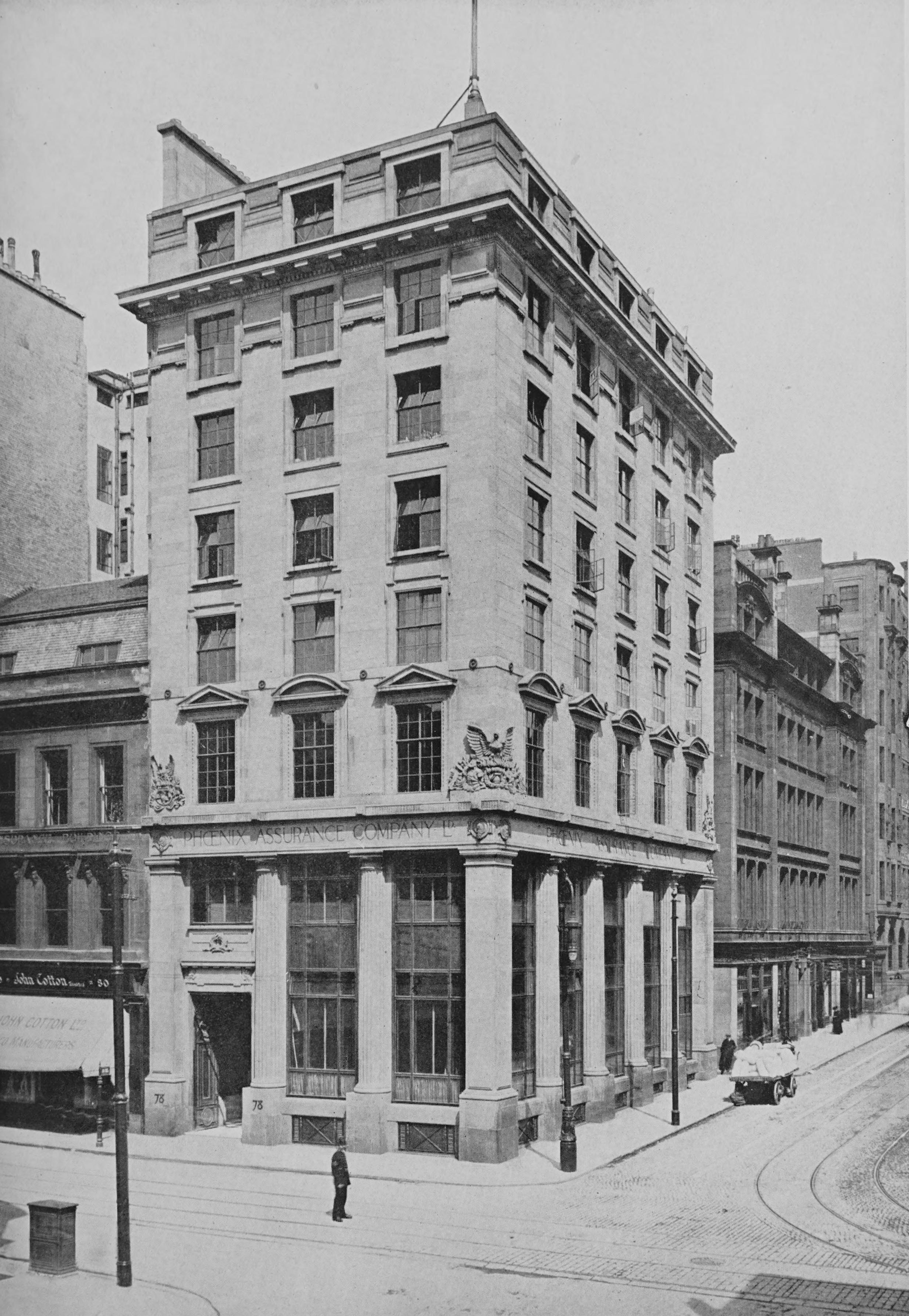
The 1914 Glasgow offices at 78 St Vincent Street, designed by Campbell & Hislop

Sun Alliance & London acquired Phoenix Assurance in 1984. In 2004, Resolution Life acquired the life insurance operations of RSA. The following year, Resolution acquired the UK operations of Swiss Life, and merged RSA Life and Swiss Life into a new group called Phoenix Life. In 2008, Pearl Group acquired Resolution Life, and in 2010 Pearl Group renamed itself Phoenix Group.
