= 68 King William Street =

Building in London, England

Coordinates: 51.511071°N 0.086396°W

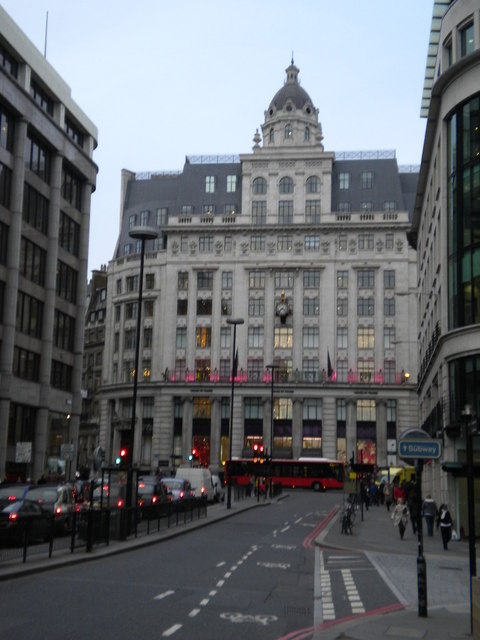
68 King William Street

68 King William Street is a building on King William Street in the City of London, built as offices for the Guardian Royal Exchange Assurance.

== History and description ==
The building was built as offices for the Guardian Royal Exchange Assurance as well as a branch of Lloyds Bank between 1920 and 1922 to the design of Henry Lennox Anderson. The building is set as the northern terminating vista of London Bridge, presenting a tall prominent facade with a domed cupola, for which special exemption for height restrictions was required.

The building has since been used as a House of Fraser department store from 2003 to 2018. It was then acquired and refurbished by Black Mountain Partners in 2019, and now hosts The Wolseley's City of London location, the second in London. It also hosts the Wagtail rooftop bar.
