= County Fire Office =

English insurance business

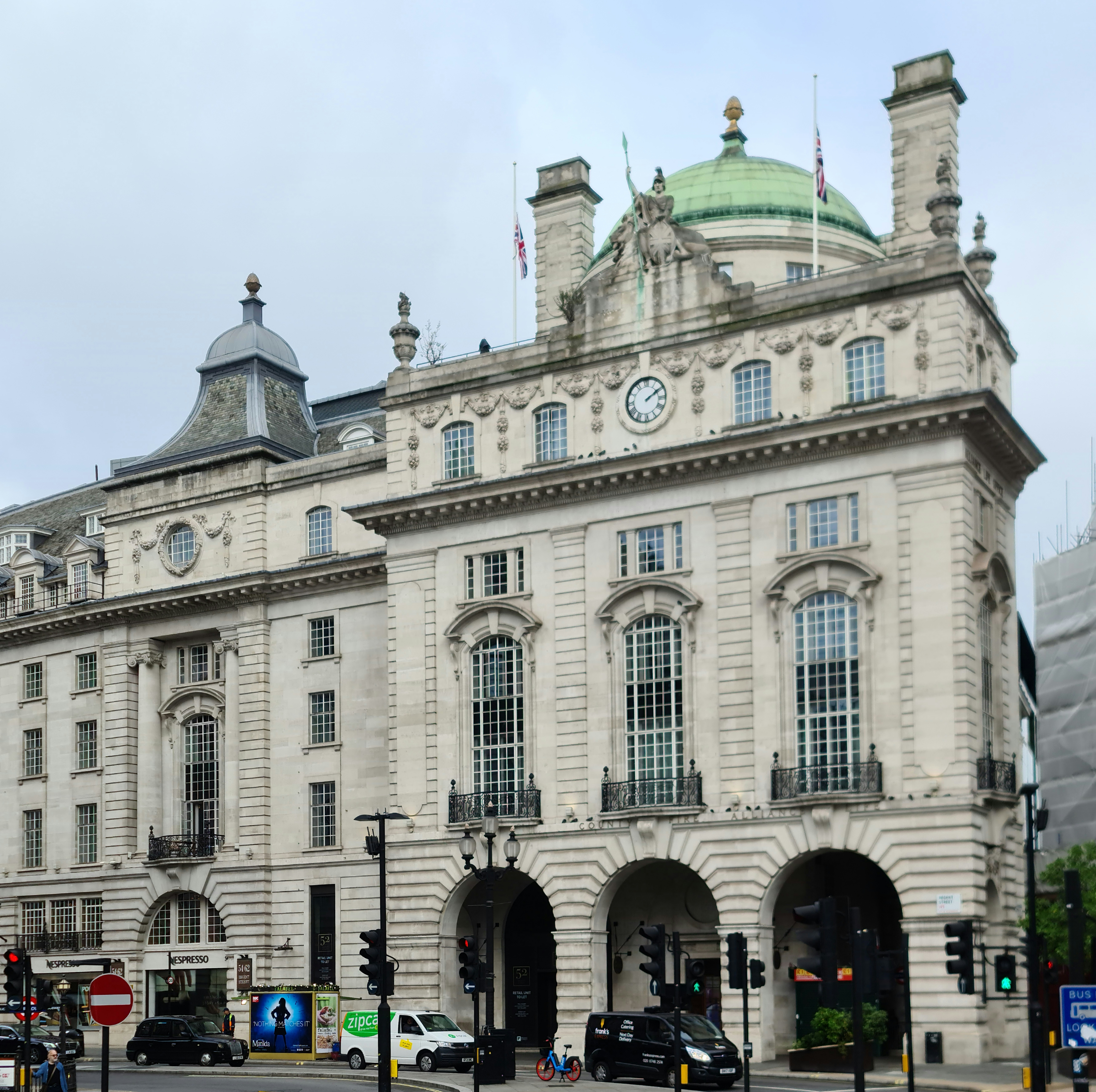
- The company's head office in Regent Street
- Industry: Insurance
- Founded: 1807; 219 years ago
- Defunct: 1906
- Fate: Acquired by Alliance Assurance
- Headquarters: London, England

The County Fire Office was an English insurance business founded in 1807 and acquired by the Alliance Assurance in 1906. Throughout this period it was run by three generations of the Barber Beaumont family.

== History ==
For all but the last few months of its independent existence, the County Fire Office was run by three generations of the Barber Beaumont family. The company was founded by John Thomas Barber Beaumont (the Beaumont being a late addition to his name) in 1807 when he was only 33. By then, Barber Beaumont already had a wide range of achievements. He was an accomplished miniaturist painter having exhibited 53 miniatures at the Royal Academy of Arts between 1794 and 1804, also painting portraits of the Royal Family. He was an author, pamphleteer, and advocate of savings banks founding a savings bank in Covent Garden in 1806. He also founded the Provident Life in that year, destined to become a sister company to the County Fire Office. At the onset of the Napoleonic Wars in 1803, he formed and commanded the Duke of Cumberland’s Sharp Shooters. He later became a Middlesex magistrate and founded the Beaumont Institute in Stepney.

The formation of the County Fire Office differed from other insurance companies in that it started as a regional organisation, hence the name. It was founded "by an association of noblemen and gentlemen" from 12 counties. The first meeting was held in April 1807 in Barber Beaumont’s Covent Garden house. Meetings of landowners and prominent citizens were held in each of the counties. Shares were allocated on the principle that each county should have an equal holding. Directors were elected from each county with Barber Beaumont managing the society. Half of the regional directors were bankers including Scrope Bernard MP as chairman; his father had been Governor of New Jersey. The County Fire Office and Provident Life were initially run from Beaumont's house, with the County Fire Office being operated from the front room on the ground floor and Provident Life from the rear on the ground floor.

Almost from the beginning of the life of the company, agencies were opened and often later converted into branches. For instance, branches were opened in Yorkshire and Lincoln in 1807, Manchester in 1809, Liverpool in 1817, Glasgow in 1819 and Belfast in 1823. The businesses enjoyed early success and a site was found in Regent Street on which a new building was erected. The new building was completed in 1819 and remodelled in 1924. The County Fire Office remained there until 1970. Barber Beaumont died in 1841 and his son, John Augustus Beaumont, was appointed managing director. John Augustus retired through ill health in 1877 after 50 years' service and he in turn was succeeded by his son, Seymour Augustus Beaumont, who had joined the company in 1870. As with his ancestors, he was managing director of both the County Fire Office and Provident Life.

By the beginning of the 20th century, a view had developed that all branches of insurance could be covered under one roof. On 2 November 1905, The Times reported that the Alliance Assurance was raising money to buy the County Fire Office, Provident Life, Westminster Fire Office and the associated business, Alliance Marine. This took its toll on Seymour Augustus and he shot himself in January 1906, supposedly due to overwork implementing the sale of the two companies. The auditors subsequently confirmed that the affairs of the company were in order. The sale agreement was approved one month after Seymour Augustus' death. The County Fire Office operated within Alliance Assurance as an autonomous subsidiary and was still doing so when a history of the County Fire Office was published in 1957.
