= Guardian Royal Exchange Assurance =

English insurance company (1968–1999)

- Type: Public
- Industry: Insurance
- Predecessor: Guardian Assurance Company; Royal Exchange Assurance Corporation
- Founded: 1968
- Defunct: 1999
- Fate: Acquired by Axa
- Headquarters: London, UK
- Key people: Lord Hambro, (Chairman)

Guardian Royal Exchange Assurance plc was a large British insurance company. It was listed on the London Stock Exchange and was a constituent of the FTSE 100 Index.

== History ==
Logo

The company was established through the merger of the Guardian Assurance Company and Royal Exchange Assurance in 1968.

In February 1998 it acquired PPP Healthcare, a private healthcare insurer, for £435m.

In February 1999 it was acquired by Axa of France for $5.7bn and integrated into its Sun Life & Provincial Holdings division. It was subsequently announced that the company would move out of the Royal Exchange Building. The life assurance business was acquired by Aegon later that year.
