= Royal Exchange Assurance Corporation =

English insurance company (1720–1968)

The Royal Exchange Assurance
- Type: Public
- Industry: Insurance
- Founded: 1720
- Defunct: 1968
- Fate: Merged with the Guardian Assurance Company
- Successor: Guardian Royal Exchange Assurance
- Headquarters: London, England
- Key people: Lord Kindersley, (Governor)

The Royal Exchange Assurance, founded in 1720, was a British insurance company. It took its name from the location of its offices at the Royal Exchange, London.

== Origins ==
The Royal Exchange Assurance emerged from a joint stock insurance enterprise known as Onslow's insurance or Onslow's Bubble. This had been begun as the Mercer's Hall Marine Company, or Undertaking kept at the Royal Exchange for insuring ships and merchandise at sea. A similar enterprise sought incorporation in 1718, but the Attorney-General reported against this. Lord Onslow then sought a means of avoiding the difficulty by his company acquiring the charters of Society of Mines Royal and Company of Mineral and Battery Works, which declared itself open for assuring ships and merchandise in March 1719. Their opponents petitioned against this and the Attorney-General reported in May 1719 that the use made of the charters was "unwarrantable". The directors admitted this mistake but requested their own charter in January 1720. They and another insurance enterprise, the London Assurance Company, each offered £300,000 towards George I's Civil List debts. The King then encouraged the House of Commons to permit their incorporation. This was done in the Bubble Act. The new chartered company then accepted subscriptions paid on shares in the old company in payment for those on its own shares.

== Chartered company ==
Royal Exchange Assurance Act 1793
- Act of Parliament
- Parliament of Great Britain
- Long title: An act to enable the Royal Exchange Assurance Companies, and their successors, to grant, purchase, and sell annuities upon or for lives.
- Citation: 33 Geo. 3. c. 14
- Territorial extent: Great Britain

Dates
- Royal assent: 28 March 1793
- Commencement: 13 December 1792 (Note: Start of session.)
- Repealed: 2 July 1901
Other legislation
Amended by	Royal Exchange Assurance Act 1796
Repealed by	Royal Exchange Assurance Act 1901
Relates to	Royal Exchange and London Assurance Corporation Act 1719; Royal Exchange Assurance Act 1796; Royal Exchange Assurance Act 1801; Royal Exchange Assurance Company's Act 1825; Royal Exchange Assurance Consolidation Act 1854; Royal Exchange Assurance Act 1871

Status: Repealed

Text of statute as originally enacted

Royal Exchange Assurance Act 1796
- Act of Parliament
- Parliament of Great Britain
- Long title: An act to explain and enlarge the powers contained in the charter of the Royal Exchange Assurance of houses and goods from fire.
- Citation: 36 Geo. 3. c. 26
- Territorial extent: Great Britain

Dates
- Royal assent: 7 March 1796
- Commencement: 7 March 1796 (Note: The Acts of Parliament (Commencement) Act 1793.)
- Repealed: 2 July 1901
Other legislation
Repealed by	Royal Exchange Assurance Act 1901
Relates to	Royal Exchange and London Assurance Corporation Act 1719; Royal Exchange Assurance Act 1793London Assurance Act 1796; Royal Exchange Assurance Act 1801; Royal Exchange Assurance Company's Act 1825; Royal Exchange Assurance Consolidation Act 1854; Royal Exchange Assurance Act 1871

Status: Repealed

Text of statute as originally enacted

Royal Exchange Assurance Act 1801
- Act of Parliament
- Parliament of the United Kingdom
- Long title: An act to enable the corporation of The Royal Exchange Assurance, to assure vessels, barges, keels, boats, and other craft employed in inland navigation, and the goods, merchandizes and effects laden therein.
- Citation: 41 Geo. 3. (U.K.) c. lvii
- Territorial extent: United Kingdom

Dates
- Royal assent: 20 June 1801
- Commencement: 20 June 1801
- Repealed: 2 July 1901
Other legislation
Repealed by	Royal Exchange Assurance Act 1901
Relates to	Royal Exchange and London Assurance Corporation Act 1719; Royal Exchange Assurance Act 1793; Royal Exchange Assurance Act 1796; Royal Exchange Assurance Company's Act 1825; Royal Exchange Assurance Consolidation Act 1854; Royal Exchange Assurance Act 1871

Status: Repealed

Text of statute as originally enacted

Royal Exchange Assurance Company's Act 1825
- Act of Parliament
- Parliament of the United Kingdom
- Long title: An Act to enable the Royal Exchange Assurance Companies, and their Successors, to advance Money, or lend Stock, upon the Security of Freehold, Copyhold or Leasehold Estates.
- Citation: 6 Geo. 4. c. xxxvii
- Territorial extent: United Kingdom

Dates
- Royal assent: 2 May 1825
- Commencement: 2 May 1825
- Repealed: 2 July 1901
Other legislation
Repealed by	Royal Exchange Assurance Act 1901
Relates to	Royal Exchange and London Assurance Corporation Act 1719; Royal Exchange Assurance Act 1793; Royal Exchange Assurance Act 1796; Royal Exchange Assurance Act 1801; Royal Exchange Assurance Consolidation Act 1854; Royal Exchange Assurance Act 1871

Status: Repealed

Royal Exchange Assurance Consolidation Act 1854 (Note: Section 14.)
- Act of Parliament
- Parliament of the United Kingdom
- Long title: An Act to consolidate the Stock and Powers of the Corporation of "The Royal Exchange Assurance of Houses and Goods from Fire" with the Stock and Powers of the Corporation of "The Royal Exchange Assurance," and to confer on the last-named Corporation the Powers of "The Royal Exchange Assurance Annuity Company" and "The Royal Exchange Assurance Loan Company," and to give additional Powers to "The Royal Exchange Assurance."
- Citation: 17 & 18 Vict. c. xi
- Territorial extent: United Kingdom

Dates
- Royal assent: 12 May 1854
- Commencement: 12 May 1854
- Repealed: 2 July 1901
Other legislation
Repealed by	Royal Exchange Assurance Act 1901
Relates to	Royal Exchange and London Assurance Corporation Act 1719; Royal Exchange Assurance Act 1793; Royal Exchange Assurance Act 1796; Royal Exchange Assurance Act 1801; Royal Exchange Assurance Company's Act 1825; Royal Exchange Assurance Act 1871

Status: Repealed

Text of statute as originally enacted

Royal Exchange Assurance Act 1871 (Note: Section 1.)
- Act of Parliament
- Parliament of the United Kingdom
- Long title: An Act to repeal so much of an Act passed in the sixth year of the reign of King George the First as restricts persons from being at the same time members of the Royal Exchange Assurance and of the London Assurance; and for other purposes.
- Citation: 34 & 35 Vict. c. xvi
- Territorial extent: United Kingdom

Dates
- Royal assent: 25 May 1871
- Commencement: 25 May 1871
- Repealed: 2 July 1901
Other legislation
Amends	Royal Exchange and London Assurance Corporation Act 1719
Repealed by	Royal Exchange Assurance Act 1901
Relates to	Royal Exchange and London Assurance Corporation Act 1719; Royal Exchange Assurance Act 1793; Royal Exchange Assurance Act 1796; Royal Exchange Assurance Act 1801; Royal Exchange Assurance Company's Act 1825; Royal Exchange Assurance Consolidation Act 1854

Status: Repealed

Text of statute as originally enacted

Royal Exchange Assurance Act 1901
- Act of Parliament
- Parliament of the United Kingdom
- Long title: An Act to repeal the Special Acts of the Royal Exchange Assurance and to make further provisions in relation to the laws objects and regulations of the Royal Exchange Assurance and for other purposes.
- Citation: 1 Edw. 7. c. x
- Territorial extent: United Kingdom

Dates
- Royal assent: 2 July 1901
- Commencement: 2 July 1901
Other legislation
Repeals/revokes	Royal Exchange Assurance Act 1793; Royal Exchange Assurance Act 1796; Royal Exchange Assurance Act 1801; Royal Exchange Assurance Company's Act 1825; Royal Exchange Assurance Consolidation Act 1854; Royal Exchange Assurance Act 1871
Amended by	Royal Exchange Assurance Act 1960
Relates to	Royal Exchange Assurance Act 1925; Royal Exchange Assurance Act 1930

Status: Amended

Text of statute as originally enacted

Royal Exchange Assurance Act 1925
- Act of Parliament
- Parliament of the United Kingdom
- Long title: An Act to empower the Royal Exchange Assurance to create and issue debentures or debenture stock to amend the fundamental laws of the Corporation and for other purposes.
- Citation: 15 & 16 Geo. 5. c. xlv
- Territorial extent: United Kingdom

Dates
- Royal assent: 31 July 1925
- Commencement: 31 July 1925
Other legislation
Amended by	Royal Exchange Assurance Act 1960
Relates to	Royal Exchange Assurance Act 1901; Royal Exchange Assurance Act 1930

Status: Amended

Text of statute as originally enacted

Royal Exchange Assurance Act 1930
- Act of Parliament
- Parliament of the United Kingdom
- Long title: An Act to confer further powers upon the Royal Exchange Assurance.
- Citation: 20 & 21 Geo. 5. c. cxviii
- Territorial extent: United Kingdom

Dates
- Royal assent: 10 July 1930
- Commencement: 10 July 1930
Other legislation
Amended by	Royal Exchange Assurance Act 1960
Relates to	Royal Exchange Assurance Act 1901; Royal Exchange Assurance Act 1925

Status: Amended

Text of statute as originally enacted

Royal Exchange Assurance Act 1960 (Note: Section 1(1).)
- Act of Parliament
- Parliament of the United Kingdom
- Long title: An Act to amend the royal charters and enactments relating to the Royal Exchange Assurance.
- Citation: 8 & 9 Eliz. 2. c. xv
- Territorial extent: United Kingdom

Dates
- Royal assent: 2 June 1960
- Commencement: 2 June 1960
Other legislation
Amends	Royal Exchange Assurance Act 1901; Royal Exchange Assurance Act 1925; Royal Exchange Assurance Act 1930

Status: Current legislation

Text of statute as originally enacted

The company received its royal charter under the Royal Exchange and London Assurance Corporation Act 1719 (6 Geo. 1. c. 18), popularly known as the Bubble Act. Under the terms of this legislation, the Royal Exchange and the London Assurance Company were the only incorporated bodies chartered to write marine insurance. Although this eliminated competition from other corporations, private underwriters, such as those at Lloyd's of London would remain in business. This arrangement continued until the partial repeal of the act by the Bubble Companies, etc. Act 1825 (6 Geo. 4. c. 91). In 1959, Royal Exchange acquired the Atlas Assurance Company.

== Amalgamation ==
The Royal Exchange Assurance survived as an independent company for over two centuries until merging with the Guardian Assurance Company in 1968 to form Guardian Royal Exchange Assurance.

=== Governors ===
Notable governors of the Royal Exchange Assurance included:

- Nicholas Magens (1741-1750)
- Pascoe Grenfell (1829–1838)
- Thomas Tooke (1840–1852)
- Octavius Wigram (1852–1878)
- Vivian Smith, 1st Baron Bicester (1914–1956)
- Hugh Kindersley, 2nd Baron Kindersley (1955–1968)
