= Isaac Gompertz =

English poet (1774–1856)

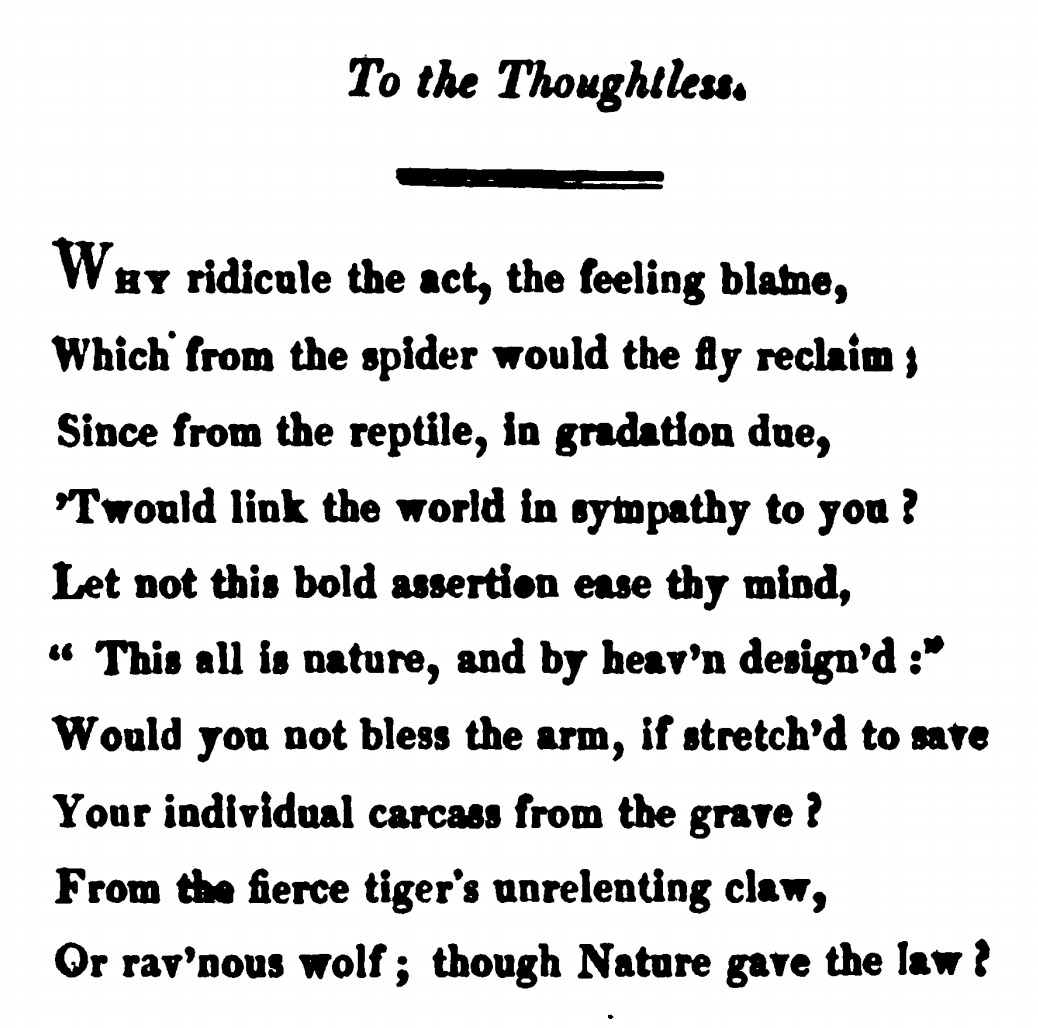
- "To the Thoughtless" from The Modern Antique; Or, The Muse in the Costume of Queen Anne (1813)
- Born: 1774; Middlesex, England
- Died: 25 February 1856 (aged 82); London, England
- Resting place: Brompton Cemetery
- Occupation: Poet
- Spouse: Charlotte Florence Wattier (m. 1818)
- Children: 3
- Relatives: Benjamin Gompertz (brother); Lewis Gompertz (brother); Gompertz family
- Writing career
- Pen name: J. Gompertz
- Period: 1813–1825
- Notable work: "The Modern Antique"; "Time, or Light and Shade"; "Devon"

Isaac Gompertz (1774 – 25 February 1856) was an English poet. He was known for the poems "The Modern Antique", "Time, or Light and Shade" and "Devon", the latter of which was published under the name J. Gompertz.

== Biography ==
=== Early life and family ===
Isaac Gompertz was born into a Jewish family in Middlesex in 1774. He was one of at least 15 children of Solomon Barent Gompertz, a London diamond merchant, and his second wife, Leah Deborah Cohen. His brothers included the animal rights activist and inventor Lewis Gompertz and the mathematician and actuary Benjamin Gompertz. He later composed epitaphs for his brother Barent and for Lewis' wife.

Being Jewish, he was not allowed to attend university.

=== Writing ===
Gompertz published three books of poetry The Modern Antique, Time, or Light and Shade, and Devon. The latter was published under the name J. Gompertz.

=== Personal life and death ===
Gompertz married Charlotte Florence Wattier on 3 December 1818 at St Mary's Church, Ealing. They had three sons.

Gompertz died at his home in Ebury Street, London, on 25 February 1856, aged 82. He was buried at Brompton Cemetery.

== Reception ==
Gompertz's works drew positive notice from Leigh Hunt and were reported favourably in the contemporary press. Writers of the period, such as Alexander Jamieson, compared his work to that of Dryden, Pope, Addison and Gray.

== Publications ==
- The Modern Antique; Or, The Muse in the Costume of Queen Anne (London: W. Pople, 1813; published anonymously)
- Time, or Light and Shade (London: Longman, Hurst, Rees, Orme, and Brown, 1815)
- Devon, a Poem (Teignmouth: 1825; published under the name J. Gompertz)
