= Bubble Act =

Act of the Parliament of Great Britain

Royal Exchange and London Assurance Corporation Act 1719
- Act of Parliament
- Parliament of Great Britain
- Long title: An Act for better securing certain Powers and Privileges intended to be granted by His Majesty by Two Charters for Assurance of Ships and Merchandizes at Sea, and for lending Money on Bottomry; and for restraining several extravagant and unwarrantable Practices therein mentioned.
- Citation: 6 Geo. 1. c. 18
- Territorial extent: Great Britain; Later extended to American colonies, including: Massachusetts

Dates
- Royal assent: 11 June 1720
- Commencement: 24 June 1720 (Note: Section 1.)
- Repealed: 5 July 1825
Other legislation
Amended by	Bubble Schemes (Colonies) Act 1740; Bubble Companies, etc. Act 1825; Statute Law Revision Act 1867; Royal Exchange Assurance Act 1871
Repealed by	Royal Exchange Assurance Act 1901
Relates to	Royal Exchange Assurance Act 1793; Royal Exchange Assurance Act 1796; Royal Exchange Assurance Act 1801; Royal Exchange Assurance Company's Act 1825; Royal Exchange Assurance Consolidation Act 1854; Royal Exchange Assurance Act 1871; Royal Exchange Assurance Act 1901; Royal Exchange Assurance Act 1925

Status: Repealed

Text of statute as originally enacted

The Bubble Act 1720 (6 Geo. 1. c. 18) (also Royal Exchange and London Assurance Corporation Act 1719) was an act of the Parliament of Great Britain passed on 11 June 1720 that incorporated the Royal Exchange Assurance Corporation and the London Assurance Corporation, but more significantly forbade the formation of any other joint-stock companies unless approved by royal charter.

Bubble Schemes (Colonies) Act 1740
- Act of Parliament
- Parliament of Great Britain
- Long title: An Act for restraining and preventing several unwarrantable Schemes and Undertakings in His Majesty's Colonies and Plantations in America.
- Citation: 14 Geo. 2. c. 37
- Territorial extent: Great Britain

Dates
- Royal assent: 25 April 1741
- Commencement: 18 November 1740 (Note: Start of session.)
- Repealed: 15 July 1867
Other legislation
Amends	Royal Exchange and London Assurance Corporation Act 1719
Repealed by	Statute Law Revision Act 1867

Status: Repealed

Text of statute as originally enacted

Its provisions were extended later by the Bubble Schemes (Colonies) Act 1740 (14 Geo. 2. c. 37) to include its colonies, particularly Massachusetts.

== Background ==
Various motivations have been suggested for the act. They include the desire to prevent the speculation that produced the contemporary South Sea Bubble, an attempt to prevent smaller non-charter companies from forming and so reduce the importance of Parliament in regulating businesses; or the South Sea Company itself wanting to prevent other bubbles from forming that might have decreased the intensity of its own.

Recent scholarship indicates that the last was the cause: it was passed to prevent other companies from competing with the South Sea Company for investors' capital.

Bubble Companies, etc. Act 1825
- Act of Parliament
- Parliament of the United Kingdom
- Long title: An Act to repeal so much of an Act passed in the Sixth Year of His late Majesty King George the First, as relates to the restraining several extravagant and unwarrantable Practices in the said Act mentioned; and for conferring additional Powers upon His Majesty, with respect to the granting of Charters of Incorporation to trading and other Companies.
- Citation: 6 Geo. 4. c. 91
- Territorial extent: United Kingdom

Dates
- Royal assent: 5 July 1825
- Commencement: 5 July 1825
- Repealed: 5 August 1873
Other legislation
Amends	Royal Exchange and London Assurance Corporation Act 1719
Repealed by	Statute Law Revision Act 1873
Relates to	Bubble Schemes (Colonies) Act 1740

Status: Repealed

Text of statute as originally enacted

In fact, the act was passed in June 1720, before the peak of the bubble. The act was partially repealed in 1825 by the Bubble Companies, etc. Act 1825 (6 Geo. 4. c. 91). The residue of the act was repealed in 1901.

== Provisions ==
The act declared "illegal and void" all business that raised money or offered shares in the manner of a chartered company without a charter from the royal government. Under the terms of the act, the Royal Exchange Assurance Corporation and the London Assurance Corporation were granted charters to write marine insurance. Until 1824, they remained the only joint-stock firms with such a charter.

== See also ==
- R v Cawood (1790) 2 Ld Raym 1361, 92 ER 386 (1 January 1790) - the only prosecution brought under the act which, according to L.C.B. Gower, "decided nothing of importance".
