= Sun Alliance (company) =

English insurance company (1959–1996)

Sun Alliance Group plc

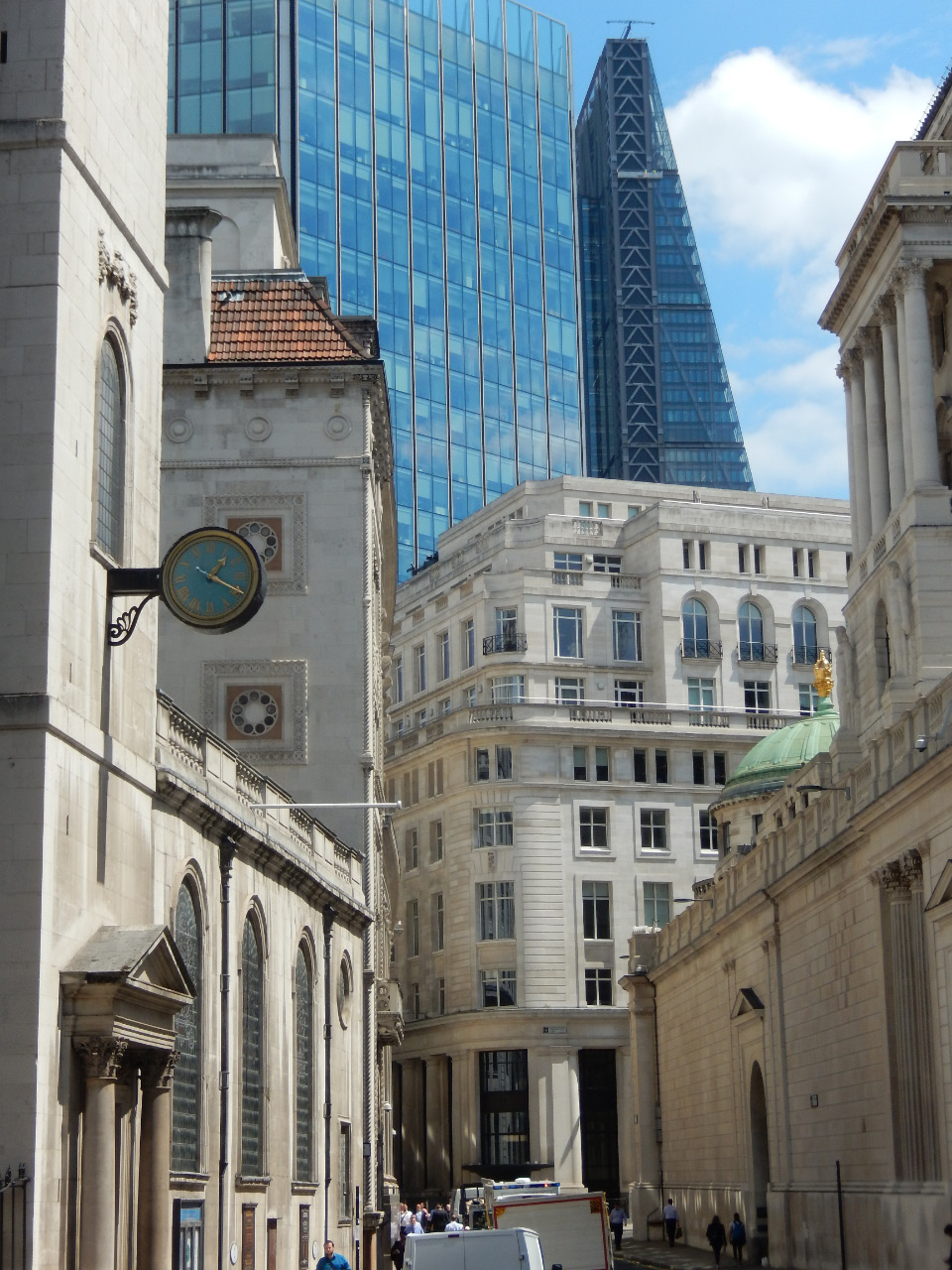
- 1 Bartholomew Lane in London (the stone building straight ahead)
- Type: Public
- Industry: Insurance
- Predecessor: Sun Insurance; Alliance Assurance
- Founded: 1959; 67 years ago
- Defunct: 1996
- Fate: Merged with Royal Insurance
- Successor: RSA Insurance Group
- Headquarters: London, England

Sun Alliance Group plc was a large insurance business with its main offices in the City of London and later Horsham. In 1996 Sun Alliance merged with Royal Insurance to form the Royal & Sun Alliance Insurance Group.

== History ==
The company was created in 1959 by the merger of Sun Insurance, founded in 1710, and Alliance Assurance founded in 1824.

In the mid-1960s Sun Alliance established its administrative centre in a large office block, spanning an A-road through the town centre of Horsham, a railway town 31 miles (50 km) south of London's centre. and its head office at 1 Bartholomew Lane in London. The Horsham building, St Marks Court is earmarked as developable. In an external recess, to the market place (Carfax) side, is the tall spired tower of the church. Its nave was demolished in about 1985. The spire was part of the original church of 1841 constructed from sandstone. The tower's base has become a florist and volunteers’ centre.

Sun Alliance went on to acquire the London Assurance Company in 1965 (becoming Sun Alliance & London) and Phoenix Assurance in 1984. The company thus added suffix "Group" in 1989, consolidated most UK-based operations into the Horsham office in 1990, and yet kept its London head office. The company merged with Royal Insurance to form the Royal & Sun Alliance Insurance Group in 1996.

^{Summary of all notable mergers to 1996 and company inception dates:}
  - Royal & Sun Alliance Insurance Group plc (1996)
    - Sun Alliance Group (1984)
      - Sun Alliance & London (1965) (Note: acquired Phoenix Assurance in 1984)
        - Sun Alliance Insurance Limited (1959)
          - The Sun Fire Office (1710)
          - The Alliance Assurance Company (1824)
        - London Assurance Corporation (1720)
      - Phoenix Assurance (1680)
    - Royal Insurance (1845)

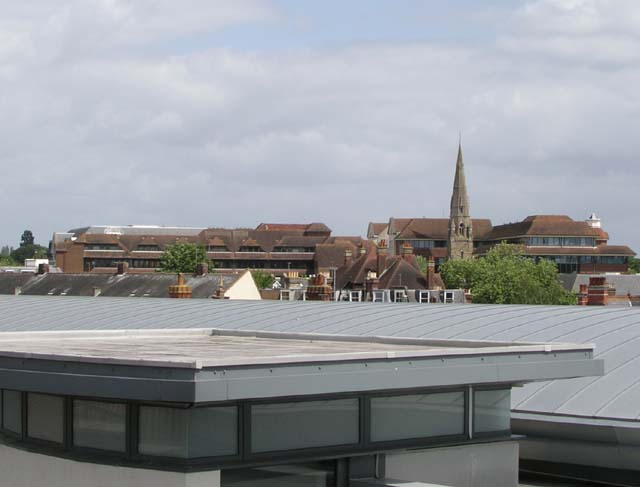
Sun Alliance offices in Horsham, behind the spire that sits in one of its recesses

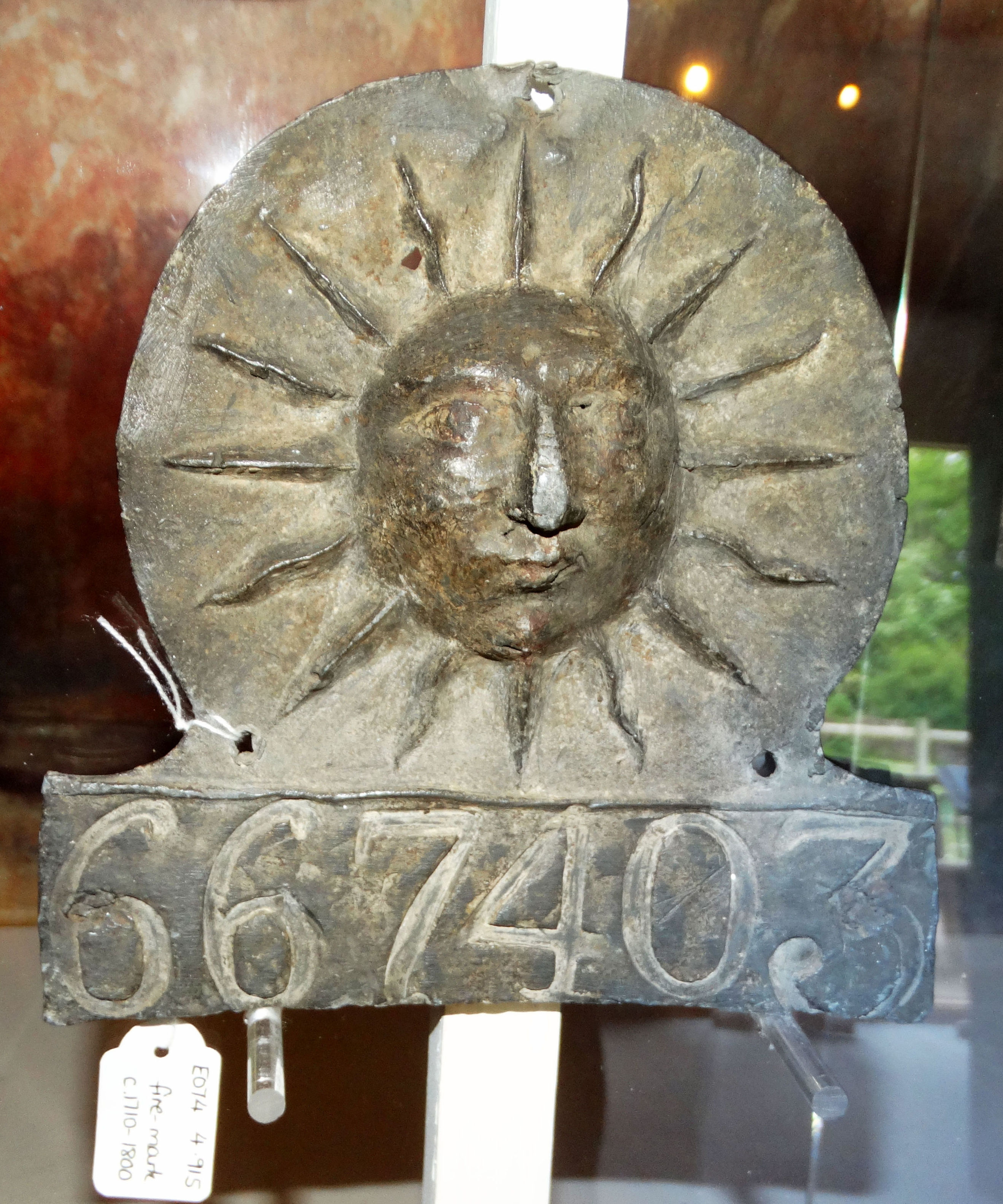
A Sun Fire Office insurance mark
