= London Assurance Company =

English insurance company (1720–1965)

- Industry: Insurance
- Founded: 1720
- Defunct: 1965
- Fate: Acquired by Sun Alliance
- Headquarters: 1 King William Street, City of London
- Key people: Lord Chetwynd (Governor)

The London Assurance Corporation Limited was an English insurance company founded in 1720, in the midst of the South Sea Bubble speculation. It was acquired by Sun Alliance in 1965 to form the Sun Alliance and London.

== Background ==
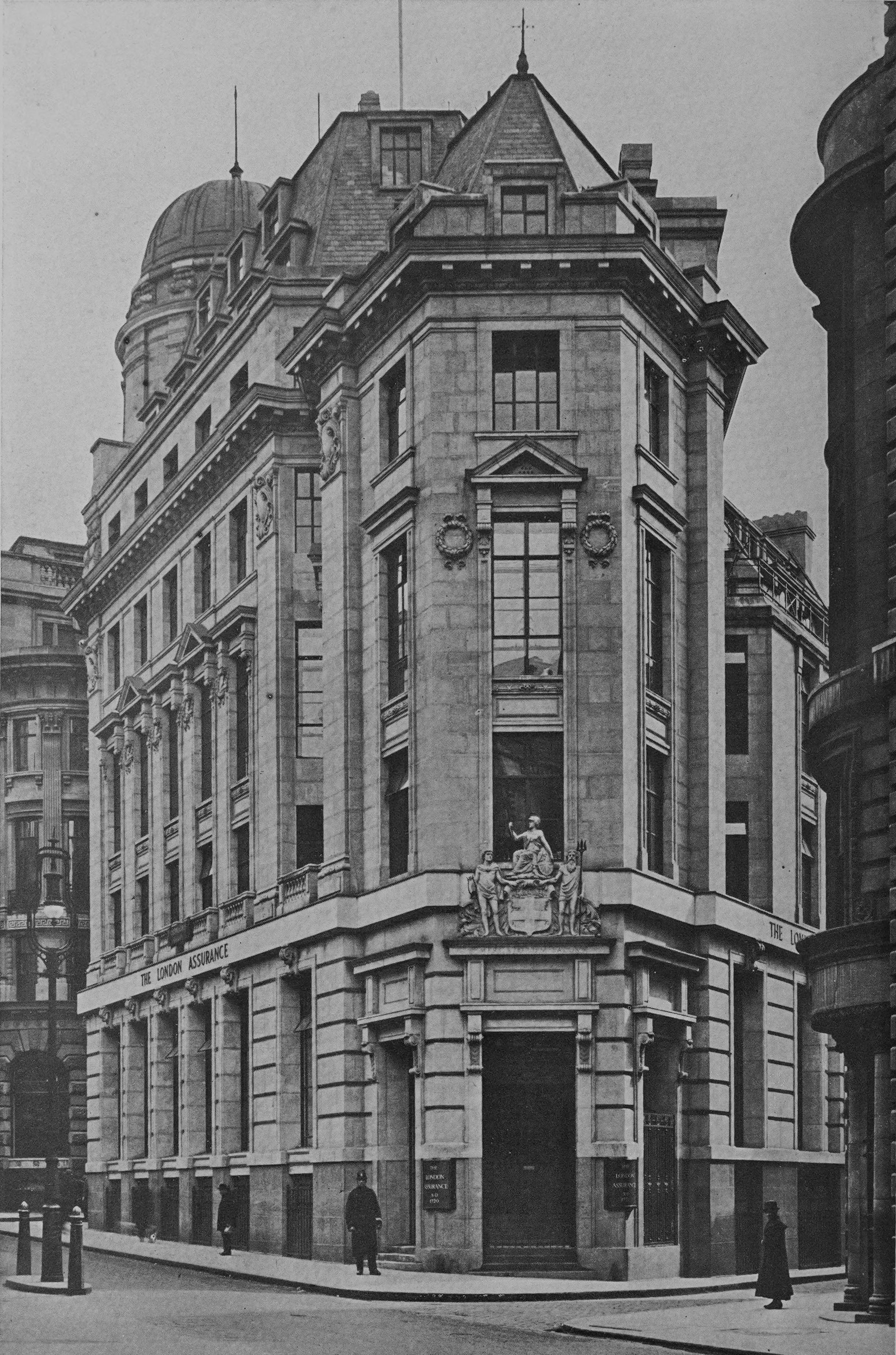
The 1922 head office 1 King William, designed by Campbell-Jones, Son & Smithers

The period 1719-20 saw an upsurge in joint stock flotations with marine insurance being prominent. Amongst the embryo schemes were ones by Stephen Ram and James Colebrook and these provided “the seed” for London Assurance. Colebrook was a merchant banker and a heavy subscriber to the combined society. Stephen Ram was a member of the Court of the Goldsmiths Company, a treasurer of Corr’s lottery and had enjoyed mixed success with other speculative ventures. The London Assurance flotation came in January 1720 and was spectacularly successful, its share price rising even faster than that of the South Sea Company. However, the scale of the speculation led to the passing of the Bubble Act in June 1720. This forbade the formation of joint stock companies unless enabled by royal charter but it also specifically allowed the incorporation of London Assurance and the Royal Exchange; it also granted the two companies a corporate monopoly of marine insurance (the individual underwriters that were eventually to coalesce into Lloyd’s of London continued to trade and still dominated the market). In August the share price of the South Sea Company began its collapse: the London Assurance share collapse was even greater falling from a high of £160 to £2.

== Early history ==
The promoters wanted to obtain a charter for the company, and Lord Chetwynd was brought in to secure it, which he did before the year was out. Chetwynd became London Assurance’s first governor and little more was heard from the original promoters. One of the conditions of the granting of the charter was the payment to the government of £300,000. In the climate of the time this caused the company financial difficulties and the position of the debt was not resolved for a year. Despite these problems, the company immediately sought a separate charter for fire assurance; this proved more difficult and was not granted until April 1721. The two charters had separate share capital but the right to share equally in each other’s profits.

By the end of 1721 the London was firmly established. It had its semi-monopolistic marine insurance business and the fire insurance arm had appointed agents throughout the country. The third leg was life assurance and the first policy was issued in June. In those early days life assurance tended to be term assurance, usually for one year and taken on third party lives rather than that of the insurer – a policy was even taken on the King’s life. By Autumn 1722 the company was able to pay its first dividend.

== Later developments ==
London Assurance Consolidation Act 1853 (Note: Section 14.)
- Act of Parliament
- Parliament of the United Kingdom
- Long title: An Act to consolidate the Stock and Powers of the Corporation of "The London Assurance of Houses and Goods from Fire" with the Stock and Powers of the Corporation of "The London Assurance," and to confer on the last-named Corporation the Powers of "The London Assurance Loan Company," and to give additional Powers to "The London Assurance."
- Citation: 16 & 17 Vict. c. i
- Territorial extent: United Kingdom

Dates
- Royal assent: 9 May 1853
- Commencement: 9 May 1853 (Note: The Acts of Parliament (Commencement) Act 1793.)
- Repealed: 21 July 1891

Other legislation
- Repealed by: London Assurance Act 1891

Status: Repealed

Text of statute as originally enacted

Despite the existence of two company histories, there is little information on the London’s subsequent development. Isolated facts from the nineteenth century include the end of the monopoly of marine insurance in 1824. The marine and fire charters were unified by the London Assurance Consolidation Act 1853, the same year that Commercial and General Life Assurance was acquired; the Asylum Life Assurance was bought four years later. 1853 was also the year that the first overseas agents were appointed, with the entry into the U.S. market taking place in 1872. As many others, London Assurance took on accident and employers' liability insurance in 1907 following the Workmen's Compensation Act 1906.

A new head office building, at No. 1 King William Street in London, was designed by William Campbell-Jones and Alec Smithers in the neoclassical style, built in ashlar stone and was completed in 1922.

After World War I the London appeared more active in the acquisitions market, buying the British Law Insurance Co. in 1918 and the Vulcan Boiler & General Insurance Co. in 1920. Overseas, the Manhattan Fire and Marine Insurance Co. was bought in 1923; the Federal Mutual Insurance Co. of Australia in 1931 and the Clive Insurance Co. of India in 1935. Corporately, London Assurance came under the control of the Companies Act in 1948 (limited accounts are still filed at Companies House). Finally, the London Assurance was acquired by Sun Alliance in 1965 to form the Sun Alliance and London.

== Arms ==
Coat of arms of London Assurance Company
| Notes Granted 30 September 1937. Crest On a wreath of the colours a female figure habited Argent seated upon a terrestrial globe Proper resting the dexter hand upon a harp Or and supporting with the sinister hand a spear point upwards also Proper pendent therefrom by a riband Gules an escutcheon of the Arms. Escutcheon Argent a cross cotised in the first and fourth quarters a dagger erect Gules on a chief Azure three anchors of the field. Supporters On the dexter side a figure representing Apollo and on the sinister side a figure representing Neptune both Proper. Motto Mercatorum Salus |
