= Benjamin Gompertz =

English self-educated mathematician and actuary (1779–1865)

Benjamin Gompertz FRS
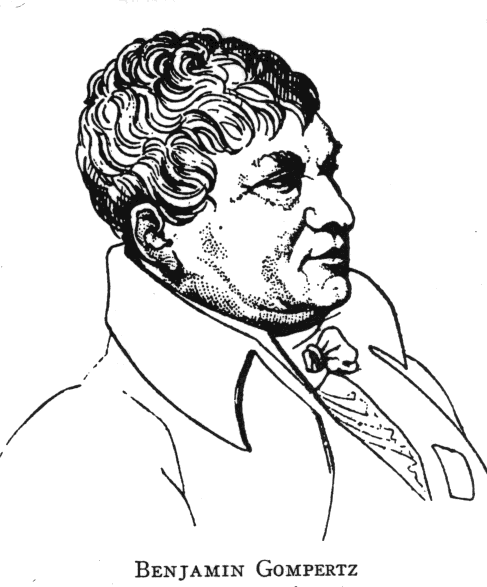
- Woodcut,
- Born: 5 March 1779; London, England
- Died: 14 July 1865 (aged 86); London, England
- Known for: Gompertz distribution Gompertz-Makeham law of mortality Gompertz constant
- Spouse: Abigail Montefiore (m. 1810)
- Children: 3
- Relatives: Isaac Gompertz (brother); Lewis Gompertz (brother)
- Family: Gompertz family
- Scientific career
- Fields: Mathematics; Astronomy
- Institutions: London Stock Exchange; Alliance Assurance Company Royal Astronomical Society

Benjamin Gompertz FRS (5 March 1779 – 14 July 1865) was an English self-educated mathematician and actuary, who became a Fellow of the Royal Society. Gompertz is now best known for his Gompertz law of mortality, a demographic model published in 1825. He was the brother of the early animal rights activist and inventor Lewis Gompertz and the poet Isaac Gompertz.

== Life ==
Of the German Jewish family of Gompertz of Emmerich, Gompertz was born in London, where his father and grandfather had been successful diamond merchants. Debarred, as a Jew, from a university education, he studied on his own from an early age, in the writings of Isaac Newton, Colin Maclaurin, and William Emerson. From 1798 he was a prominent contributor to the Gentleman's Mathematical Companion, and for a period won the annual prizes in the magazine for the solutions of problems. Gompertz married Abigail Montefiore (1790–1871) in 1810; they had three children.

In line with his father's wishes, he entered the London Stock Exchange. He became a member of the Spitalfields Mathematical Society, and served as its president when it was merged with the Astronomical Society of London. In 1819 he was elected a F.R.S., and in 1832 became a member of the council. The Astronomical Society was founded in 1820, and he was elected a member of the council in 1821.

On the death of his only son he retired from the Stock Exchange, and absorbed himself in mathematics. When the Guardian Insurance Office was established in 1821, he was a candidate for the actuaryship, but the directors objected to him on the grounds that he was a Jew. His brother-in-law Sir Moses Montefiore with his relative Nathan Mayer Rothschild then founded the Alliance Assurance Company (1824), and Gompertz was appointed actuary under the deed of settlement. His management of the Alliance Company was successful, he was consulted by government, and made computations for the Army medical board.

In 1848 he retired from active work and returned to his scientific labours. He was a member of many learned societies, and was also one of the promoters of the Society for the Diffusion of Useful Knowledge. Of the leading Jewish charities he was a prominent member, and he worked out a plan of poor relief, which was afterwards adopted by the Jewish board of guardians.

Gompertz died from a paralytic seizure on 14 July 1865.

== Works ==
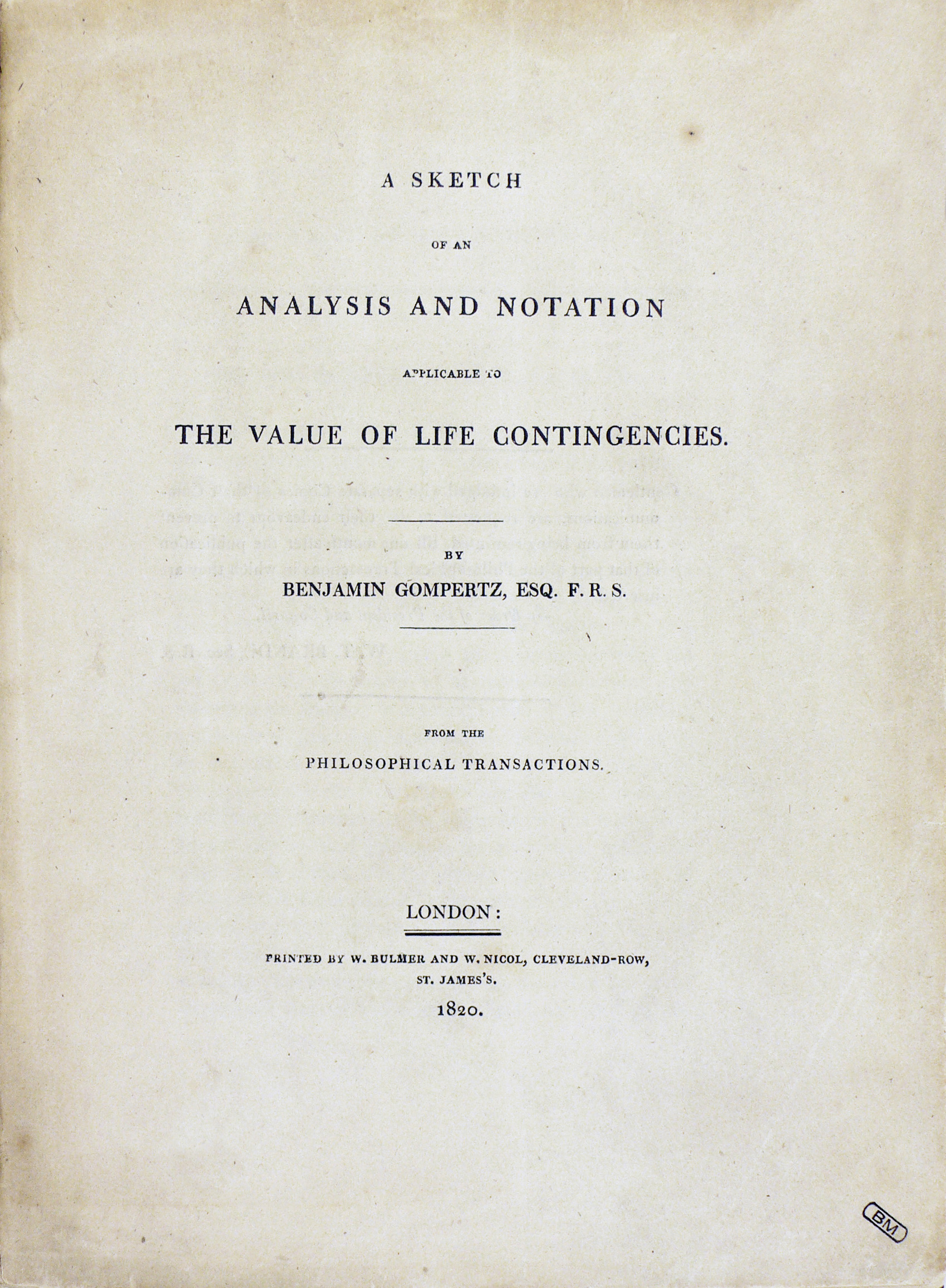
A sketch of an analysis, 1820.

Mathematics

From 1806 he was a frequent contributor to the Philosophical Transactions of the Royal Society; but his early tracts on complex numbers and porisms (1817–18) were self-published. Gompertz was an old-fashioned Newtonian who retained and defended the notation of fluxions.

Astronomy

For ten years he actively participated in the work of the Astronomical Society, contributing papers on the theory of astronomical instruments, the aberration of light, the differential sextant, and the convertible pendulum. With Francis Baily he began in 1822 the construction of tables for the mean places of the fixed stars; the work was left uncompleted, because of the publication of the Fundamenta Astronomiæ of Friedrich Bessel. Their efforts, however, led to the complete catalogue of stars of the Royal Astronomical Society.

The Gompertz model

He worked out a new series of tables of mortality for the Royal Society, and these suggested to him in 1825 his law of human mortality, which he first expounded in a letter to Francis Baily. The law rests on an a priori assumption that a person's resistance to death decreases as his years increase. The model can be written in this way:

$$N(t) = N(0) e^{-c (e^{at}-1)},\$$
where N(t) represents the number of individuals at time t, and c and a are constants.

This model is a refinement of a demographic model of Robert Malthus. It was used by insurance companies to calculate the cost of life insurance. The equation, known as a Gompertz curve, is now used in many areas to model a time series where growth is slowest at the start and end of a period. The model has been extended to the Gompertz–Makeham law of mortality.

== See also ==
- Population dynamics
- Gompertz distribution
- Gompertz-Makeham law of mortality
- Gompertz constant
