= 3rd Parliament of Great Britain =

←	2nd	4th	→
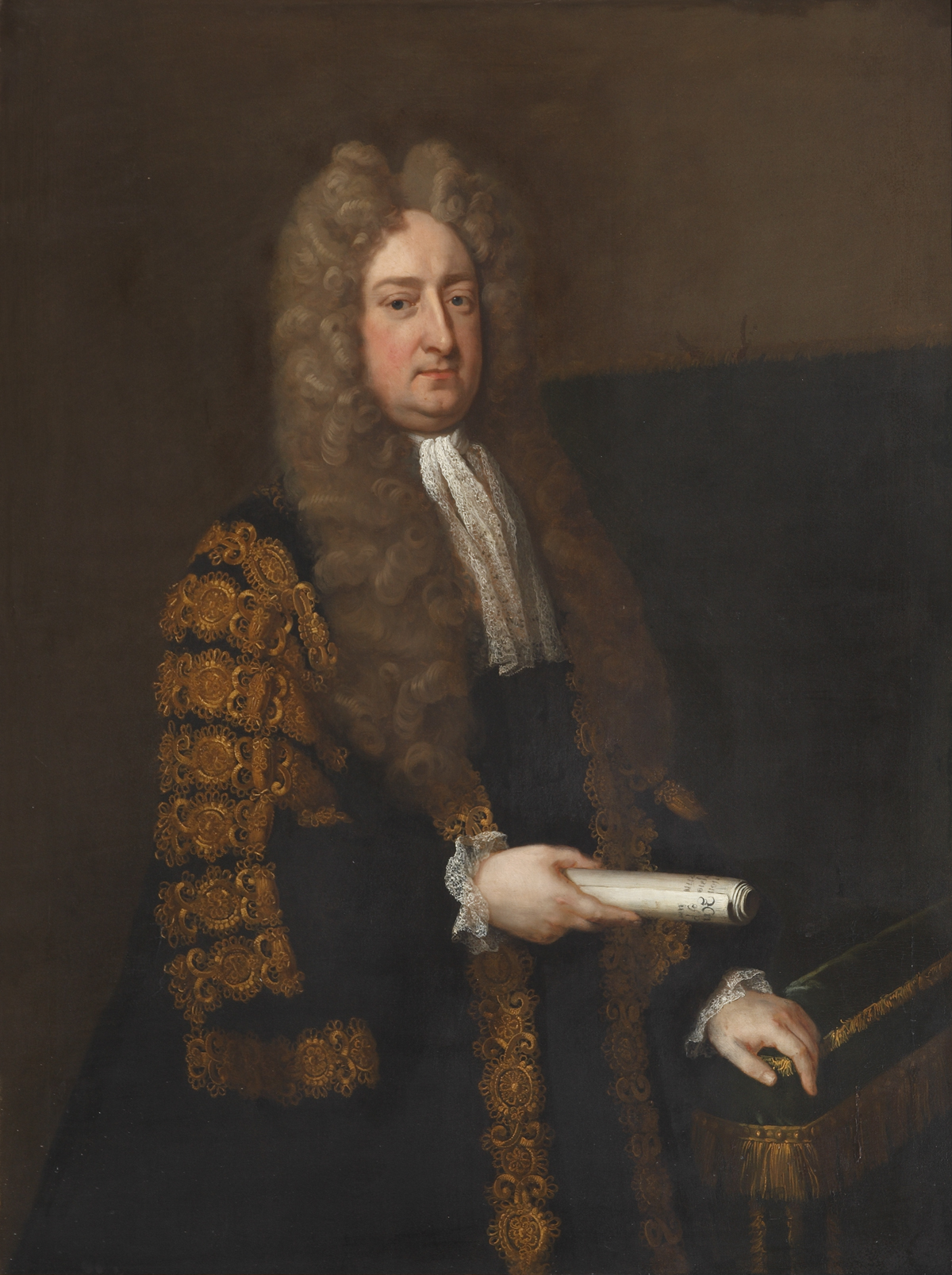
- William Bromley, Speaker of the House of Commons

Overview
- Term: 27 September 1710 – 8 August 1713

House of Commons
- Members: 558 MPs
- Speaker of the House of Commons: William Bromley

House of Lords
- Lord Keeper of the Great Seal: Baron Harcourt

Sessions
- 1st: 25 November 1710 – 12 June 1711
- 2nd: 7 December 1711 – 21 June 1712
- 3rd: 9 April 1713 – 16 July 1713

The 3rd Parliament of Great Britain was summoned by Queen Anne on 27 September 1710 and assembled on the 25 November 1710. Under the Triennial Act 1694, the Parliament was due to expire, if not dissolved sooner, at the end of the term of three years from the first meeting. In the event it was actually dissolved on 8 August 1713.

The new House of Commons comprised 346 Tories, 196 Whigs and 14 others, which represented a Tory landslide. This was largely due to anti-Government feelings caused by the trial of Henry Sacheverell for verbally attacking dissenters and a growing anti-war sentiment. William Bromley, Member of Parliament for Oxford University, was installed as Speaker of the House of Commons.

At the start of the second session the terms of a peace deal with France were defeated by the Whigs. Harley created 12 new Peers in the House of Lords, nicknamed "Harley's Dozen", to forestall a similar problem there. Harley then adroitly engineered condemnation of Britain's allies in the peace talks and by the end of the second session had got decisive backing for his policy of acting alone.

Completing the terms of the Treaty of Utrecht delayed the third session until April 1713. When it did reconvene there were open splits in the Tory party on a number of issues, such as the French commerce bill. Viscount Bolingbroke, a Secretary of State, took the opportunity to seek the leadership of the Party.

The Parliament was dissolved on 8 August 1713.

== Notable acts passed in the Parliament ==
- New Churches in London and Westminster Act 1710
- Gaming Act 1710
- Lease of Exeter Castle Act 1710
- Municipal Offices Act 1710
- Toleration Act 1711 (aka Occasional Conformity Act)
- Princess Sophia's Precedence Act 1711
- Scottish Episcopalians Act 1711
- Naturalization Act 1711
- Church Patronage (Scotland) Act 1711
- Churches in London and Westminster Act 1711
- East India Company Act 1711
- Pleading Act 1711
- West Riding Inclosures Act 1712
- Moss Troopers Act 1712
- Mortuaries (Bangor, &c.) Abolition Act 1713
- Established Church Act 1713 (aka Schism Act)
- Simony Act 1713
- Presentation of Benefices Act 1713
- Discovery of Longitude at Sea Act 1713
- Repair of Breach in Thames Bank at Dagenham: Coal Duties Act 1713

== See also ==
- 1710 British general election
- List of MPs elected in the 1710 British general election
- Oxford-Bolingbroke ministry
- List of acts of the 1st session of the 3rd Parliament of Great Britain
- List of acts of the 2nd session of the 3rd Parliament of Great Britain
- List of acts of the 3rd session of the 3rd Parliament of Great Britain
- List of parliaments of Great Britain

== Sources ==
Preceded by 2nd Parliament of Great Britain	3rd Parliament of Great Britain; 1710–1713	Succeeded by 4th Parliament of Great Britain
