= List of acts of the Parliament of Great Britain from 1717 =

This is a complete list of acts of the Parliament of Great Britain for the year 1717.

For acts passed until 1707, see the list of acts of the Parliament of England and the list of acts of the Parliament of Scotland. See also the list of acts of the Parliament of Ireland.

For acts passed from 1801 onwards, see the list of acts of the Parliament of the United Kingdom. For acts of the devolved parliaments and assemblies in the United Kingdom, see the list of acts of the Scottish Parliament, the list of acts of the Northern Ireland Assembly, and the list of acts and measures of Senedd Cymru; see also the list of acts of the Parliament of Northern Ireland.

The number shown after each act's title is its chapter number. Acts are cited using this number, preceded by the year(s) of the reign during which the relevant parliamentary session was held; thus the Union with Ireland Act 1800 is cited as "39 & 40 Geo. 3. c. 67", meaning the 67th act passed during the session that started in the 39th year of the reign of George III and which finished in the 40th year of that reign. Note that the modern convention is to use Arabic numerals in citations (thus "41 Geo. 3" rather than "41 Geo. III"). Acts of the last session of the Parliament of Great Britain and the first session of the Parliament of the United Kingdom are both cited as "41 Geo. 3".

Acts passed by the Parliament of Great Britain did not have a short title; however, some of these acts have subsequently been given a short title by acts of the Parliament of the United Kingdom (such as the Short Titles Act 1896).

Before the Acts of Parliament (Commencement) Act 1793 came into force on 8 April 1793, acts passed by the Parliament of Great Britain were deemed to have come into effect on the first day of the session in which they were passed. Because of this, the years given in the list below may in fact be the year before a particular act was passed.

== 4 Geo. 1 ==
The third session of the 5th Parliament of Great Britain, which met from 21 November 1717 until 21 March 1718.

This session was also traditionally cited as 4 G. 1.

=== Public acts ===
Short title	Citation	Royal assent
Long title
Land Tax Act 1717 (repealed)	4 Geo. 1. c. 1	23 December 1717
An act for granting an aid to his Majesty by a land-tax to be raised in Great-Britain, for the service of the year one thousand seven hundred and eighteen. (Repealed by Statute Law Revision Act 1867 (30 & 31 Vict. c. 59))
South Sea Company Act 1717 (repealed)	4 Geo. 1. c. 2	3 February 1718
An act to enable his Majesty to be governor of the South Sea company. (Repealed by Statute Law Revision Act 1867 (30 & 31 Vict. c. 59))
Taxation, etc. Act 1717 (repealed)	4 Geo. 1. c. 3	21 March 1718
An act for continuing the duties on malt, mum, cyder and perry, for the service of the year one thousand seven hundred and eighteen; and for making forth duplicates of Exchequer-bills, lottery-tickets and orders lost, burnt or destroyed, and for appropriating the supplies granted in this session of parliament. (Repealed by Statute Law Revision Act 1867 (30 & 31 Vict. c. 59))
Mutiny Act 1717 (repealed)	4 Geo. 1. c. 4	21 March 1718
An act for punishing mutiny and desertion, and for the better payment of the army and their quarters. (Repealed by Statute Law Revision Act 1867 (30 & 31 Vict. c. 59))
Saint Michael, Cornhill Building Act 1717 (repealed)	4 Geo. 1. c. 5	21 March 1718
An act for finishing the tower of the parish church of St. Michael Cornhill, London, out of the duties arising pursuant to the act of the ninth year of the late Queen, (Note: New Churches in London and Westminster Act 1710 (9 Ann. c. 17)) for building fifty new churches in and about the cities of London and Westminster and the suburbs thereof. (Repealed by Statute Law (Repeals) Act 2013 (c. 2))
Hawkers Act 1717 (repealed)	4 Geo. 1. c. 6	21 March 1718
An act for relief of the wholesale traders and dealers in English bone-lace, by obviating several doubts in the several acts for licensing hawkers and pedlars. (Repealed by Statute Law Revision Act 1867 (30 & 31 Vict. c. 59))
Silk Manufacturers Act 1717 (repealed)	4 Geo. 1. c. 7	21 March 1718
An act for making effectual an act made in the eighth year of the reign of the late Queen Anne, intituled, "An act for employing the manufacturers, by encouraging the consumption of raw silk and mohair yarn." (Note: Silk Manufacturers Act 1709 (8 Ann. c. 11)) (Repealed by Repeal of Obsolete Statutes Act 1856 (19 & 20 Vict. c. 64))
Crown Lands (Forfeited Estates) Act 1717 (repealed)	4 Geo. 1. c. 8	21 March 1718
An act for vesting the forfeited estates in Great Britain and Ireland in trustees, to be sold for the use of the publick; and for giving relief to lawful creditors, by determining the claims; and for the more effectual bringing into the respective Exchequers the rents and profits of the said estates till sold. (Repealed by Crown Lands (Forfeited Estates) Act 1800 (39 & 40 Geo. 3. c. 78) (Note: Cited as "30-40 G 3 c 78" in the Chronological Table of the Statutes; no such session exists.) and Statute Law Revision Act 1948 (11 & 12 Geo. 6. c. 62))
Debts Due to the Army, etc. Act 1717 (repealed)	4 Geo. 1. c. 9	21 March 1718
An act to appoint commissioners to take, examine, state and determine the debts due to the army; and to examine and state the demands of several foreign princes and states for subsidies during the late war. (Repealed by Statute Law Revision Act 1867 (30 & 31 Vict. c. 59))
National Debt Act 1717 (repealed)	4 Geo. 1. c. 10	21 March 1718
An act for making the dividend of subscribed lottery-annuities, and other annuities established by several acts of parliament payable half-yearly at the bank of England. (Repealed by Statute Law Revision Act 1870 (33 & 34 Vict. c. 69))
Piracy Act 1717 or the Transportation Act 1717 (repealed)	4 Geo. 1. c. 11	21 March 1718
An act for the further preventing robbery, burglary, and other felonies, and for the more effectual transportations of felons, and unlawful exporters of wool; and for declaring the law upon some points relating to pirates. (Repealed by Criminal Statutes Repeal Act 1827 (7 & 8 Geo. 4. c. 27), Criminal Law (India) Act 1828 (9 Geo. 4. c. 74), Piracy Act 1837 (7 Will. 4 & 1 Vict. c. 88), Statute Law Revision Act 1887 (50 & 51 Vict. c. 59), Statute Law Revision Act 1948 (11 & 12 Geo. 6. c. 62) and Criminal Law Act 1967 (c. 58))
Stranded Ships, etc. Act 1717 (repealed)	4 Geo. 1. c. 12	21 March 1718
An act for inforcing and making perpetual an act of the twelfth year of her late Majesty, intituled, "An act for the preserving of all such ships and goods thereof, which shall happen to be forced on shore, or stranded upon the coasts of this kingdom, or any other of her Majesty's dominions;" (Note: Stranded Ships Act 1713 (13 Ann. c. 21)) and for inflicting the punishment of death on such as shall wilfully burn or destroy ships. (Repealed by Merchant Shipping Repeal Act 1854 (17 & 18 Vict. c. 120))
Dover Harbour Act 1717 (repealed)	4 Geo. 1. c. 13	21 March 1718
An act for enlarging the term of years granted by the acts of the eleventh and twelfth years of King William the Third, (Note: Dover Harbour Act 1698 (11 Will. 3. c. 5)) and second and third years of Queen Anne, (Note: Dover Harbour Act 1703 (2 & 3 Ann. c. 7)) for the repair of Dover harbour. (Repealed by Dover Harbour Act 1828 (9 Geo. 4. c. xxxi))
Saint Giles in the Fields Rebuilding Act 1717 (repealed)	4 Geo. 1. c. 14	21 March 1718
An act to impower the commissioners appointed to put in execution the acts of the ninth and tenth (Note: Churches in London and Westminster Act 1711 (10 Ann. c. 20)) years of her late Majesty's reign, for building fifty new churches in and about the cities of London and Westminster, and suburbs thereof, to direct the parish church of St. Giles in the Fields in the county of Middlesex to be rebuilt, instead of one of the said fifty new churches. (Repealed by Statute Law (Repeals) Act 2013 (c. 2))

=== Private acts ===
Short title	Citation	Royal assent
Long title
Bubb's Name Act 1717	4 Geo. 1. c. 1 Pr.	3 February 1718
An Act to enable George Bubb Esquire and his Issue Male to change their Surname to the Surname of Doddington.
Boetefeur's Naturalization Act 1717	4 Geo. 1. c. 2 Pr.	3 February 1718
An Act for naturalizing Abraham Boeteseur.
Bristol Hospitals and Workhouses Act 1717 (repealed)	4 Geo. 1. c. 3 Pr.	21 March 1718
An Act for the better explaining several Acts therein mentioned, for erecting of Hospitals and Workhouses within the City of Bristol, for the employing and maintaining the Poor thereof; and for making the said Acts more effectual. (Repealed by Bristol Improvement Act 1822 (3 Geo. 4. c. xxiv))
London, East Grinstead, Sutton and Kingston Roads Act 1717 (repealed)	4 Geo. 1. c. 4 Pr.	21 March 1718
An Act for amending the Roads from the City of London to the Town of East Grinstead, in the County of Sussex, and to the Towns of Sutton and Kingston, in the County of Surrey. (Repealed by Statute Law (Repeals) Act 2013 (c. 2))
Southwark, Greenwich and Lewisham Roads Act 1717 (repealed)	4 Geo. 1. c. 5 Pr.	21 March 1718
An Act for reparing the Highways leading from The Stone's-end of Kent Street, in the Parish of St. George's Southwark, in the County of Surrey, to the Lime Kilns, in East Greenwich, near Blackheath, and to Lewisham Church, being the Tunbridge Road, in the County of Kent. (Repealed by Statute Law (Repeals) Act 2013 (c. 2))
Maidenhead, Twyford and Henley Roads Act 1717 (repealed)	4 Geo. 1. c. 6 Pr.	21 March 1718
An Act for repairing the Highways from Maidenhead Bridge to Sunning Lane-end (next to Twiford) in the Road to Reading; and from the said Bridge to Henley Bridge, (Note: Henley Bridge in Henley-on-Thames. 51°32′15″N 0°54′01″W) in the County of Berks. (Repealed by Roads from Maidenhead Bridge to Reading and to Henley Bridge Act 1806 (46 Geo. 3. c. cxlv))
Reading and Basingstoke Road Act 1717 (repealed)	4 Geo. 1. c. 7 Pr.	21 March 1718
An Act for repairing the Highways from Crown Corner, (Note: Crown Corner is located in Reading at the junction of the A4 Crown Street/London Road, and the A327 Silver Street/London Street. 51°27′02″N 0°58′01″W) in the Town of Reading, leading (by and through the several Parishes of Shinfield and Heckfield, in the several Counties of Berks, Wilts, and Southampton) to Basingstoke, in the said County of Southampton. (Repealed by Road from Reading to Basingstoke Act 1801 (41 Geo. 3. (U.K.) c. lix))
Estates of William, Duke of Devonshire and William Cavendish, Marquis of Hartington: settlement of estates on the marriage of the Marquis of Hartington with Catherine Hoskins.	4 Geo. 1. c. 8 Pr.	21 March 1718
An Act for settling the Estates of the most Noble William Duke of Devonshire, and William Cavendish Esquire, commonly called Marquis of Hartington, Son and Heir Apparent of the said Duke, on the Marriage of the said Marquis of Hartington with Catharine Hoskins Spinster, only Child of John Hoskins Esquire, deceased.
Enabling the Duke of Kent and Antony Grey, Earl of Harrold to make jointures for the wife or wives of the Earl of Harrold and other purposes therein mentioned.	4 Geo. 1. c. 9 Pr.	21 March 1718
An Act to enable Henry Duke of Kent, and Anthony Grey Esquire, commonly called Earl of Harrold, to make Jointures for the Wife or Wives of the said Earl of Harrold; and for other Purposes therein mentioned.
Vesting the manor of Esher Wattervile and other land in Thomas, Duke of Newcastle in consideration of rent charges issuing out of the same and other lands, in lieu thereof, to the use of the Corporation of Kingston-upon-Thames (Surrey) in trust for the poor of the town.	4 Geo. 1. c. 10 Pr.	21 March 1718
An Act for vesting the Manor of Esher Waterville, and other Lands therein mentioned, in the most Noble Thomas Holles Duke of Newcastle and his Heirs, in Consideration of Rent-charges to be issuing out of the same, and other Lands, in Lieu thereof, to the Use of the Corporation of Kingston upon Thames, in the County of Surrey, in Trust for the Poor of the said Town.
Earl of Burlington's Estate Act 1717	4 Geo. 1. c. 11 Pr.	21 March 1718
An Act to enable Richard Earl of Burlington to make Leases of a Piece of Ground behind Burlington House.
Confirmation of sales of a fee farm rent and other lands in Bedfordshire made between John Lord Carterett and William Hilderson and discharge of the same from estates, terms and trusts to which they are respectively liable by settlements made thereof.	4 Geo. 1. c. 12 Pr.	21 March 1718
An Act for confirming the respective Sales of a Fee-farm Rent, and divers Lands, Tenements, and Hereditaments, in the County of Bedford, lately made by the Right Honourable John Lord Carteret and William Hillersdon Esquire to each other; and to discharge the same from divers Estates, Terms, and Trusts, to which they are respectively liable by several Settlements made thereof.
Vesting the great tithes and glebe lands of the rectory of Saxby (Leicestershire) in Bennet, Lord Harborough in lieu of other lands and an annuity to be settled on said rector and his successors forever, and other provisions.	4 Geo. 1. c. 13 Pr.	21 March 1718
An Act for vesting the Great Tithes and Glebe Lands, belonging to the Rectory of Saxby, in the County of Leicester, in the Right Honourable Bennet Lord Harborough and his Heirs, in Lieu of other Lands, and an Annuity to be settled on the Rector of the said Church and his Successors for ever; and for other Purposes therein mentioned.
Earl of Kildare's Estate Act 1717	4 Geo. 1. c. 14 Pr.	21 March 1718
An Act for Sale of Part of the Estate of John late Earl of Kildare, deceased, towards Payment of his Debts; and for other the Purposes therein mentioned.
Bathurst's Estate Act 1717	4 Geo. 1. c. 15 Pr.	21 March 1718
An Act for establishing the Disposition of the Personal Estate of Sir Benjamin Bathurst, deceased, and the Settlements on his Three Sons, under his Will; and exchanging Ground-rents, in Wapping, in Midd'x, for another Rent, of like Value; and other Purposes therein mentioned.
Bertie's Estate Act 1717	4 Geo. 1. c. 16 Pr.	21 March 1718
An Act for the better enabling the Honourable James Bertie Esquire to raise Portions for his Younger Children.
Making more effectual certain articles of agreement made between Sir George Downing and Dame Mary Forester and her trustees.	4 Geo. 1. c. 17 Pr.	21 March 1718
An Act for making more effectual certain Articles of Agreement between Sir George Downing Baronet, and Dame Mary Eldest Daughter of Sir William Forester Knight, and her Trustees.
Napier's Estate Act 1717	4 Geo. 1. c. 18 Pr.	21 March 1718
An Act for confirming an Agreement between Dame Elizabeth Napier, Sir Theophilus Napier Baronet, Archibald Napier, and Edward Napier, the Relict and Sons of Sir John Napier, deceased; touching his Real and Personal Estate, for vesting his Lands and Hereditaments, in the Counties of Bedford and Hertford, in Trustees, for the better Performance of the said Agreement.
Eversfield's Estate Act 1717	4 Geo. 1. c. 19 Pr.	21 March 1718
An Act for vesting divers Lands and Tenements, in the County of Sussex, Part of the Estate of Charles Eversfield Esquire, in Trustees, for a present Provision for his Son, and for the Payment of the Debts of the said Charles Eversfield.
Thurston's Estate Act 1717	4 Geo. 1. c. 20 Pr.	21 March 1718
An Act for Sale of Part of the Estate late of Joseph Thurston Esquire, deceased, lying in the Counties of Suffolk and Essex, for Payment of his Debts, and making Provision for his Instant Children.
Cornwall's Estate Act 1717	4 Geo. 1. c. 21 Pr.	21 March 1718
An Act for the exonerating and discharging the Manors, Lands, and Hereditaments, of Francis Cornwall Esquire; and likewise the said Francis Cornwall of and from certain Articles of Agreement made before the Marriage of the said Francis Cornwall.
Shipperdson's Estate Act 1717	4 Geo. 1. c. 22 Pr.	21 March 1718
An Act to enable Ralph Shipperdson Esquire to make Sale of his Estate, in Studley Roger, in the County of York, freed from the Uses and Trusts in the said Ralph Shipperdson's Marriage Settlement; and to settle his Estate, at East Mourton, in the County of Durham, to the same Uses.
Enabling the Lords Commissioners of the Treasury or Lord High Treasurer to compound with John Offley for the debt owed to the Crown for duties on tobacco.	4 Geo. 1. c. 23 Pr.	21 March 1718
An Act to enable the Lords Commissioners of the Treasury, or Lord High Treasurer for the Time being, to compound with Mr. John Offley, for the Debt he stands engaged for to the Crown, for the Duties on Tobacco.
Naturalization of Peter Rose and others.	4 Geo. 1. c. 24 Pr.	21 March 1718
An Act to naturalize Peter Rose and others.
Naturalization of Martin Ludolph, Ulrick Jansen, John Ludolph Spellerbergh, John Spiker and Laurence Gundeloah.	4 Geo. 1. c. 25 Pr.	21 March 1718
An Act to naturalize Martin Ludolph, Ulrick Jansen, John Ludolph Spellerberg, John Spieker, and Laurence Gundelach.

=== Sources ===
- Pickering, Danby, ed. (1764). "Anno quarto Georgii I". The Statutes at Large. Vol. 13: From the Twelfth Year of Queen Anne to the Fifth Year of King George I. Cambridge: Joseph Bentham. pp. 459–476 – via Internet Archive.
- Pickering, Danby, ed. (1764). "Anno quarto Georgii I". The Statutes at Large. Vol. 13: From the Twelfth Year of Queen Anne to the Fifth Year of King George I. Cambridge: Joseph Bentham. pp. 459–476 – via Google Books.
- Pickering, Danby, ed. (1764). "Anno quarto Georgii I". The Statutes at Large. Vol. 13: From the Twelfth Year of Queen Anne to the Fifth Year of King George I. Cambridge: Joseph Bentham. pp. 459–476 – via Internet Archive.
- Pickering, Danby, ed. (1764). "Anno quarto Georgii I". The Statutes at Large. Vol. 13: From the Twelfth Year of Queen Anne to the Fifth Year of King George I. Cambridge: Joseph Bentham. pp. 459–476 – via Internet Archive.
- Journals of the House of Commons. Vol. 18. London: His Majesty's Stationery Office. 1803. pp. 627–774 – via Google Books.
- Chronological Table of and Index to the Statutes. Vol. 1: To the End of the Session 59 Vict. Sess. 2 (1895) (13th ed.). London: Her Majesty's Stationery Office. 1896. p. 94 – via Google Books.

== See also ==
- List of acts of the Parliament of Great Britain
