= 5th Parliament of Great Britain =

←	4th	6th	→
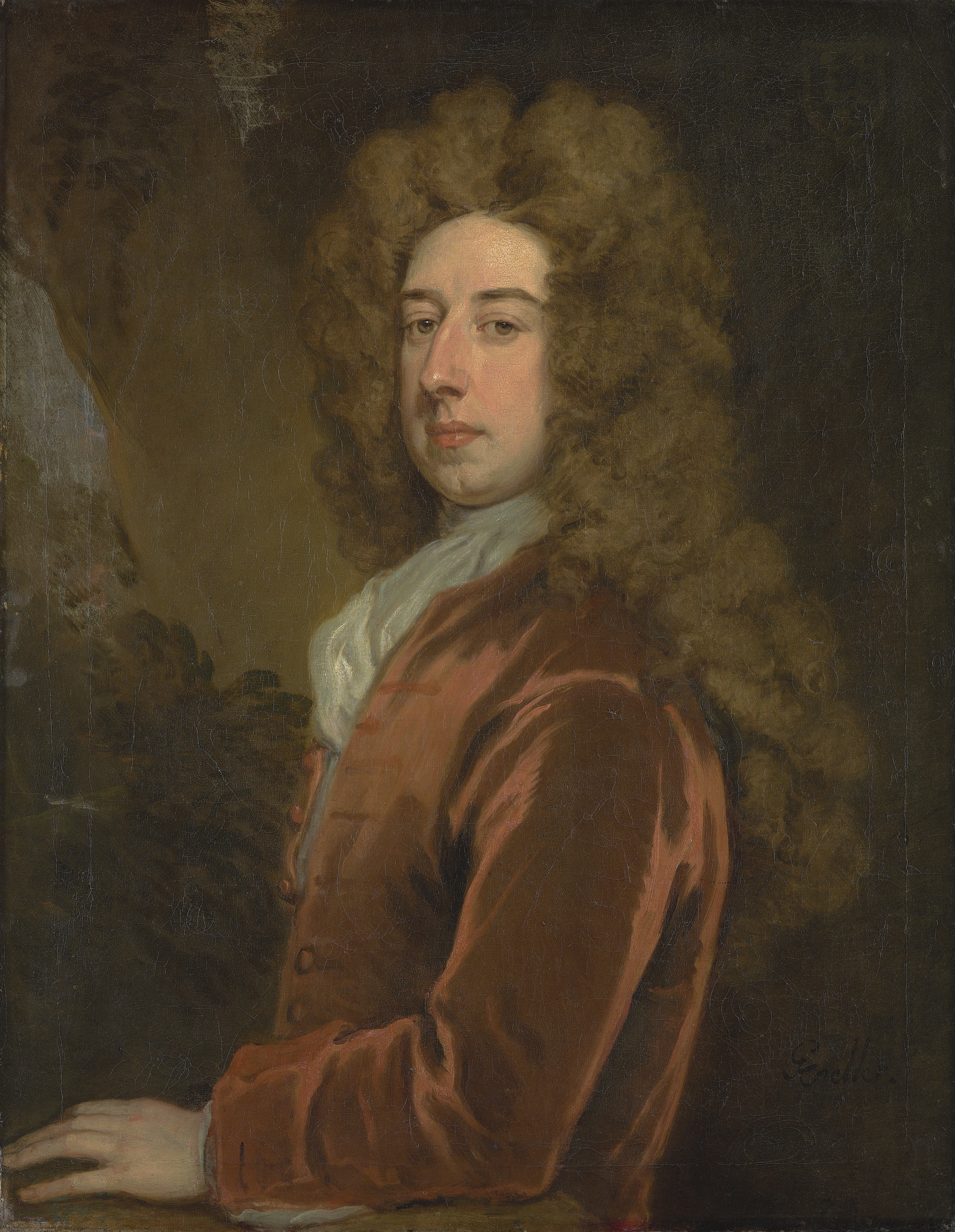
- Portrait of Spencer Compton by Godfrey Kneller. Compton served as speaker of the House of Commons

Overview
- Term: 17 March 1715 – 10 March 1722
- Government: Whig dominated

House of Commons
- Members: 558 MPs
- Speaker of the House of Commons: Spencer Compton, 1st Earl of Wilmington

House of Lords
- Leader of the House of Lords: Viscount Townshend

Sessions
- 1st: 17 March 1715 – 26 June 1716
- 2nd: 20 February 1717 – 15 July 1717
- 3rd: 21 November 1717 – 21 March 1718
- 4th: 11 November 1718 – 18 April 1719
- 5th: 23 November 1719 – 11 June 1720
- 6th: 8 December 1720 – 29 July 1721
- 7th: 31 July 1721 – 10 August 1721
- 8th: 19 October 1721 – 7 March 1722

The 5th Parliament of Great Britain was summoned by George I of Great Britain on 17 January 1715 and assembled on the 17 March 1715. When it was dissolved on 10 March 1722 it had been the first Parliament to be held under the Septennial Act 1716.

== Composition and Speaker of the House ==
The composition of the new House of Commons represented a massive Whig landslide victory at the election, reversing the pro-Tory landslide of the previous election, with 341 Whigs and 217 Tories. Spencer Compton, 1st Earl of Wilmington, the Whig member for Sussex, was installed as Speaker of the House of Commons.

== Domination of Whigs under Townshend, Stanhope, and Walpole ==
George I's administration was largely composed of Whigs, being the party which had wholeheartedly supported his accession, and which now enjoyed the full support of the Commons. Viscount Townshend, Secretary of State for the Northern Department and chief ministerial spokesman in the Lords, emerged as the King’s chief minister. The leader of the Whig ministry in the House of Commons was James Stanhope, Secretary of State for the Southern Department. However, during the first session Stanhope was eclipsed by Robert Walpole, the Paymaster-general and brother-in-law of Viscount Townshend. In October 1715 Walpole was promoted to the post of First Lord of the Treasury.

== Replacement in party leadership by Sunderland and Stanhope ==
The dominance of Townsend and Walpole caused discontent within the party and by early 1717 both had been forced out of their positions. Townsend was replaced by Lord Sunderland, who was also Lord President of the Council and who in March 1718 became First Lord of the Treasury, effectively consolidating his position to that of a Prime Minister. For the next three years George I's ministry would be led jointly by Lord Sunderland and James Stanhope, with Townshend and Walpole in opposition.

== South Sea Bubble and restoration in power of Townshend and Walpole ==
However by 1721, with Sunderland now in the House of Lords, Stanhope dead and the crisis caused by the South Sea Bubble, both Townshend and Walpole had been able to get back into power, Townshend as Secretary of State and Walpole as First Lord of the Treasury in place of Sunderland.

== Septennial Act ==
Before the first session closed, the Septennial Act 1716 was passed, lengthening the life of parliaments to seven years. An attempt to restrict the royal prerogative to create peers was defeated in 1719.

== Notable acts of the Parliament ==
- Riot Act 1714
- Queen Anne's Bounty Act 1714
- Schism Act 1714
- Security of the Sovereign Act 1714
- Attainder of Duke of Ormonde Act 1714
- Building of Churches, London and Westminster Act 1714
- Septennial Act 1715
- Papists Act 1715
- Bank of England Act 1716
- Queen Anne's Bounty Act 1716
- Papists Act 1716
- Transportation Act 1717
- Indemnity Act 1717
- Religious Worship Act 1718
- Corporations Act 1718
- Adulteration of Coffee Act 1718
- Dependency of Ireland on Great Britain Act 1719
- Royal Exchange and London Assurance Corporation Act 1719 (aka Bubble Act)

== See also ==
- 1715 British general election
- Townshend ministry 1714–1718
- First Stanhope–Sunderland ministry 1717–1718
- Second Stanhope–Sunderland ministry 1718-1721
- Walpole–Townshend ministry 1721–1730
- List of acts of the 1st session of the 5th Parliament of Great Britain
- List of acts of the 2nd session of the 5th Parliament of Great Britain
- List of acts of the 3rd session of the 5th Parliament of Great Britain
- List of acts of the 4th session of the 5th Parliament of Great Britain
- List of acts of the 5th session of the 5th Parliament of Great Britain
- List of acts of the 6th session of the 5th Parliament of Great Britain
- List of acts of the 7th session of the 5th Parliament of Great Britain
- List of acts of the 8th session of the 5th Parliament of Great Britain
- List of parliaments of Great Britain

== Sources ==
Preceded by 4th Parliament of Great Britain	5th Parliament of Great Britain; 1715–1722	Succeeded by 6th Parliament of Great Britain
