= Up Helly Aa =

Local festival celebrated in Shetland, Scotland

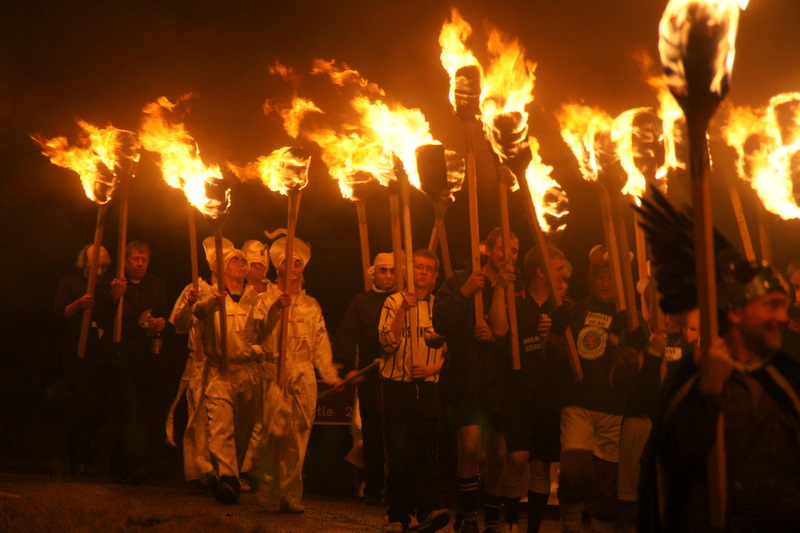
- Guizers at an Up Helly Aa celebration in Uyeasound, February 2010
- Observed by: Residents of the Shetland Islands
- Significance: Traditional end of Yuletide in Scotland
- Celebrations: Torchlight procession, burning of a replica Viking galley, guizing, parties, charades, ceilidhs
- Begins: Last Tuesday of January
- Ends: March
- 2025 date: 28 January
- 2026 date: 27 January
- 2027 date: 26 January
- Frequency: Annual
- First time: 1881

Up Helly Aa (Shaetlan pronunciation: [ˌɔp hɛli ˈaː] UP-hel-ee-AH; literally "Up Holy [Day] All") is a type of fire festival held annually from January to March in various communities in Shetland, Scotland, to mark the end of the Yule season. Each festival involves a torchlit procession by squads of costumed participants (known as guizers) that culminates in the burning of an imitation Viking galley.

The largest festival is held in Lerwick, Shetland's capital, and involves a procession of up to a thousand guizers who march through the streets of Lerwick on the last Tuesday in January. The other rural festivals (known as the 'country' Up Helly Aas) see lower numbers of participants in accordance with their lower populations.

== Origins ==
The current Lerwick celebration grew out of the older yule tradition of tar barrelling which took place at Christmas and New Year as well as Up Helly Aa. Squads of young men would drag barrels of burning tar through town on sledges, making mischief. According to the Shetland Museum, the catalyst for the establishment of Up Helly Aa was the boredom of young men after their return from fighting in the Napoleonic Wars, which had given them an opportunity to see spectacles abroad. Concern over public safety and levels of drunkenness led to a change in the celebrations, and saw them drawing inspiration from the islands' Viking history.

After the abolition of tar barrelling around 1874–1880, permission was eventually obtained for torch processions. The first Yule torch procession took place in 1876. The first torch celebration on Up Helly Aa Day took place in 1881. The following year the torchlit procession was significantly enhanced and institutionalised through a request by a Lerwick civic body to hold another Up Helly Aa torch procession for the visit of Alfred, Duke of Edinburgh. The first galley was fabricated and burned in 1889.

In 1894 Haldane Burgess, a Shetland author, wrote the book The Viking Path, which was a major influence in creating the Viking theme of the Up Helly Aa festival. Burgess also wrote the Up Helly Aa Song which is sung at the burning of the replica longship and elsewhere. The honorary role of the 'Jarl' was introduced to the festival in the early twentieth century. In reality, despite many sources claiming these ancient origins, the festival, and many like it, were products of Victorian do-goodery. The Lerwick Up-Helly Aa was first established by the Total Abstinence Society in the 1870s to give the young men who would otherwise drink themselves silly something to do. The name itself derives from Upholiday, the lowland Scots' word for Twelfth Day, and was brought by them to the Shetland Islands in the 19th century.

== The modern event ==
There is a main guizer who is dubbed the "Jarl" (pron. "yarl"). There is a committee which a person must be part of for 15 years before one can be a jarl, and only one person is elected to this committee each year. The procession culminates in the torches being thrown into a replica Viking longship or galley. The event happens all over Shetland and is currently celebrated at eleven locations – Scalloway, Lerwick, Nesting and Girlsta, Uyeasound, Northmavine, Bressay, Cullivoe, Norwick, Waas, the South Mainland and Delting. After the procession, the squads visit local halls (including schools, sports facilities and hotels), where private parties are held. At each hall, each squad performs its act, which may be a send-up of a popular TV show or film, a skit on local events, or singing or dancing.

Certain aspects of the festival have been changed for the modern day; for example, as of 2020 the use of blackface has been banned at festivals in Shetland. Traditionally the guizers at the main festival in Lerwick have always been male (although some women joined the march in 1901 disguised in their costumes). However some smaller rural festivals now include women and the South Mainland Up Helly Aa festival appointed a female Jarl in 2015. Starting from the 2023 festival, restrictions on women's participation within squads in Lerwick were removed.

== Meaning ==
According to John Jamieson's Etymological Dictionary of the Scottish Language (1818), up is used in the sense of something being at an end, and derives from the Old Norse word uppi which is still used in Faroese and Icelandic, while helly refers to a holy day or festival. The Scottish National Dictionary defines helly, probably derived from the Old Norse helgr (helgi in the dative and accusative case, meaning a holiday or festival), as "[a] series of festive days, esp. the period in which Christmas festivities are held from 25th Dec. to 5th Jan.", while aa may represent a', meaning "all".

== Lerwick Up Helly Aa gallery ==
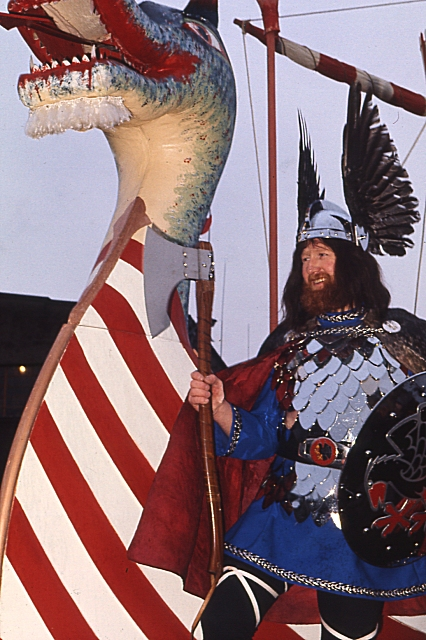
1 – The Guizer Jarl. The Guizer Jarl is the principal character in the celebration of Up Helly Aa, which takes place on the last Tuesday in January. Each Guizer Jarl takes the name of a figure in Norse legend. This one was Flokki of the Ravens.

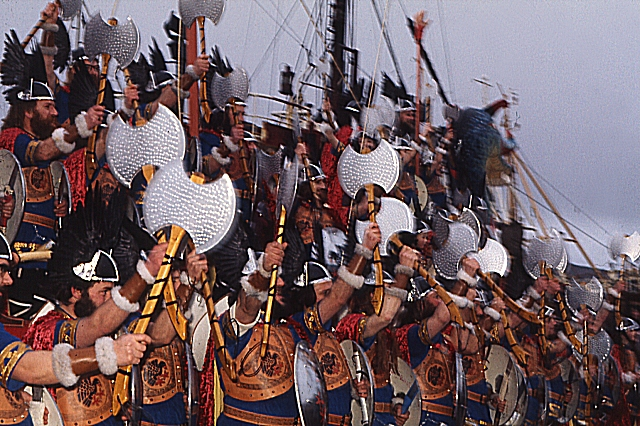
2 – The Jarl Squad. The Jarl's Squad is made up of the Guizer Jarl's supporters. It is the principal of many squads, and the participants are called guizers.

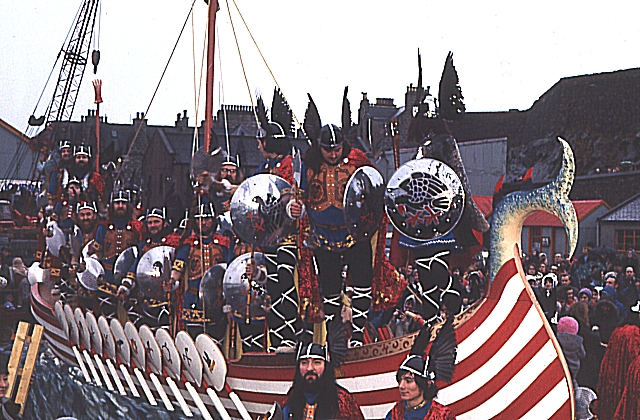
3 – The Galley. Each year a replica of a Viking longship is built for Up Helly Aa.

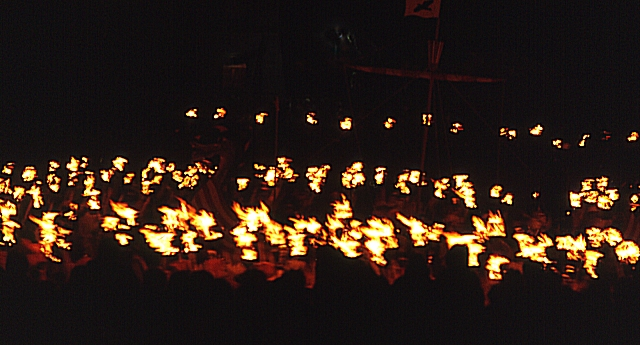
4 – The Procession. After nightfall the longship is dragged through the streets of the town in a torchlight procession. The torchbearers are the members of all the squads, led by the Jarl's Squad. Each squad chooses a theme and dresses accordingly. The themes are very varied, some historical, some topical or satirical.

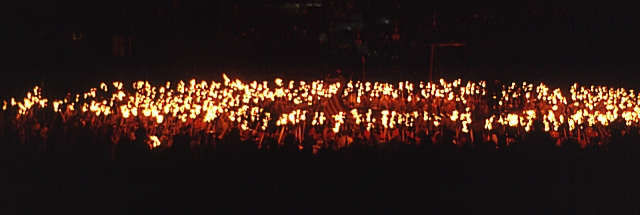
5 – The Circle Round the Galley. When all the torchbearers arrive at the final resting spot of the longship, they form a circle round it and sing the traditional Up Helly Aa song.

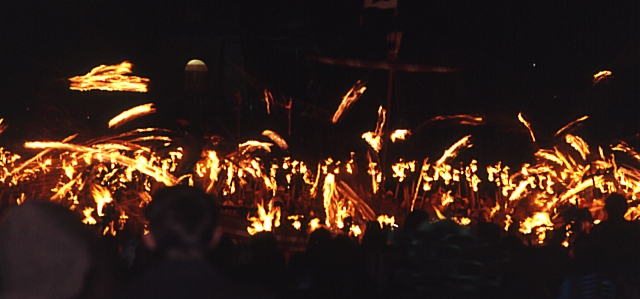
6 – Setting Fire to the Galley. After the singing of the Up Helly Aa song, the guizers throw their torches into the longship.

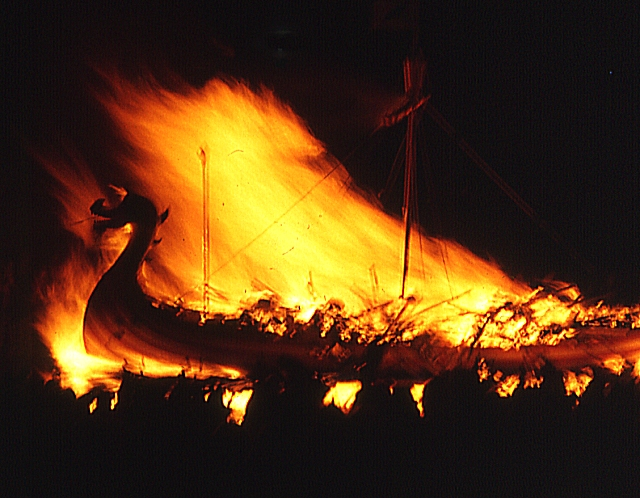
7 – The Burning Galley. Once the longship has burned and the flames die down, guizers sing the traditional song "The Norseman's Home" before going on to a night of partying. Any available large room is pressed into service as a hall, presided over by a hostess who issues invitations to attend, and every guizer squad visits every hall in turn to dance and drink with the guests. As there can be dozens of squads and dozens of halls, this takes most of the night and well into the following morning. The day after is the "Hop Night" where further dances and celebrations are held.

== See also ==
- Burning the clavie
- Olavsfestival
- Ólavsøka
