= List of acts of the Parliament of Great Britain from 1711 =

This is a complete list of acts of the Parliament of Great Britain for the year 1711.

For acts passed until 1707, see the list of acts of the Parliament of England and the list of acts of the Parliament of Scotland. See also the list of acts of the Parliament of Ireland.

For acts passed from 1801 onwards, see the list of acts of the Parliament of the United Kingdom. For acts of the devolved parliaments and assemblies in the United Kingdom, see the list of acts of the Scottish Parliament, the list of acts of the Northern Ireland Assembly, and the list of acts and measures of Senedd Cymru; see also the list of acts of the Parliament of Northern Ireland.

The number shown after each act's title is its chapter number. Acts are cited using this number, preceded by the year(s) of the reign during which the relevant parliamentary session was held; thus the Union with Ireland Act 1800 is cited as "39 & 40 Geo. 3. c. 67", meaning the 67th act passed during the session that started in the 39th year of the reign of George III and which finished in the 40th year of that reign. Note that the modern convention is to use Arabic numerals in citations (thus "41 Geo. 3" rather than "41 Geo. III"). Acts of the last session of the Parliament of Great Britain and the first session of the Parliament of the United Kingdom are both cited as "41 Geo. 3".

Acts passed by the Parliament of Great Britain did not have a short title; however, some of these acts have subsequently been given a short title by acts of the Parliament of the United Kingdom (such as the Short Titles Act 1896).

Before the Acts of Parliament (Commencement) Act 1793 came into force on 8 April 1793, acts passed by the Parliament of Great Britain were deemed to have come into effect on the first day of the session in which they were passed. Because of this, the years given in the list below may in fact be the year before a particular act was passed.

== 10 Ann. ==
The second session of the 3rd Parliament of Great Britain, which met from 7 December 1711 until 21 June 1712.

This session was also traditionally cited as 10 Anne or 10 A.

=== Public acts ===
Short title	Citation	Royal assent
Long title
Land Tax Act 1711 (repealed)	10 Ann. c. 1	22 December 1711
An Act for granting an Aid to Her Majesty, to be raised by a Land Tax in Great Britain, for the Service of the Year One Thousand Seven Hundred and Twelve. (Repealed by Statute Law Revision Act 1867 (30 & 31 Vict. c. 59))
River Avon Navigation Act 1711	10 Ann. c. 2 (Note: This is the citation in The Statutes of the Realm.); 10 Ann. c. 8 Pr. (Note: This is the citation in The Statutes at Large.)	22 May 1712
An Act for making the River Avon, in the Counties of Somerset and Gloucester, navigable, from the City of Bath, to or near Hanham's Mills.
Kilburn Road Act 1711 (repealed)	10 Ann. c. 3; 10 Ann. c. 7 Pr.	22 May 1712
An Act for repairing the Highway between a certain Place called Kilburn Bridge, (Note: Kilburn Bridge was located where the Edgware Road (Kilburn High Road) crossed the River Westbourne. The river is now culverted. 51°32′08″N 0°11′25″W) in the County of Midd'x, and Sparrows Hern, (Note: Sparrows Herne was a settlement located between Bushey and Bushey Heath. The section of the A411 road in the area continues the name. 51°38′17″N 0°21′04″W) in the County of Hertford. (Repealed by Kilburn Road Act 1779 (19 Geo. 3. c. 120) and Metropolis Roads Act 1826 (7 Geo. 4. c. cxlii))
Highgate and Chipping Barnet Road Act 1711 (repealed)	10 Ann. c. 4; 10 Ann. c. 33 Pr.	6 June 1712
An Act for repairing the Highway, between Highgate Gatehouse, in the County of Middlesex, and Barnet Blockhouse, in the County of Hertford. (Repealed by Highgate and South Mimms Road Act 1815 (55 Geo. 3. c. l))
Assise of Fuel Act 1711 (repealed)	10 Ann. c. 5; 10 Ann. c. 6	9 February 1712
An Act for explaining and altering the Laws now in being, concerning the Assizes of Fuel, so far as they relate to the Assize of Billet made, or to be made, of Beech-wood only. (Repealed by Statute Law Revision Act 1867 (30 & 31 Vict. c. 59))
Occasional Conformity Act 1711 or the Toleration Act 1711 (repealed)	10 Ann. c. 6; 10 Ann. c. 2	22 December 1711
An Act for preserving the Protestant Religion by better securing the Church of England as by Law established and for confirming the Toleration granted to Protestant Dissenters by an Act intituled "An Act for exempting Their Majesties Protestant Subjects dissenting from the Church of England from the Penalties of certain Laws" (Note: Toleration Act 1688 (1 Will. & Mar. c. 18)) and for supplying the Defects thereof and for the further securing the Protestant Succession by requiring the Practicers of the Law in North Britain to take the Oaths and subscribe the Declaration therein mentioned. (Repealed by Promissory Oaths Act 1871 (34 & 35 Vict. c. 48))
Malt Tax Act 1711 (repealed)	10 Ann. c. 7; 10 Ann. c. 3	9 February 1712
An Act for charging and continuing the Duties upon Malt, Mum, Cyder, and Perry, for the Service of the Year One Thousand Seven Hundred and Twelve; and for applying Part of the Coinage Duties, to pay the Deficiency of the Value of Plate coined; and for re-coining the old Money in Scotland. (Repealed by Statute Law Revision Act 1867 (30 & 31 Vict. c. 59))
Princess Sophia's Precedence Act 1711	10 Ann. c. 8; 10 Ann. c. 4	9 February 1712
An Act for settling the Precedence of the most Excellent Princess Sophia Electress and Dutchess Dowager of Hanover of the Elector Her Son and of the Electoral Prince the Duke of Cambridge.
Naturalization Act 1711 (repealed)	10 Ann. c. 9; 10 Ann. c. 5	9 February 1712
An Act to repeal the Act of the Seventh Year of Her Majesty's Reign, intituled, "An Act for naturalizing Foreign Protestants," (Note: Foreign Protestants Naturalization Act 1708 (7 Ann. c. 9)) except what relates to the Children of Her Majesty's Natural-born Subjects, born out of Her Majesty's Allegiance. (Repealed by Statute Law Revision Act 1867 (30 & 31 Vict. c. 59))
Scottish Episcopalians Act 1711	10 Ann. c. 10; 10 Ann. c. 7	3 March 1712
An Act to prevent the disturbing those of the Episcopal Communion in Scotland in the Exercise of their Religious Worship and in the Use of the Liturgy of the Church of England and for repealing the Act passed in the Parliament of Scotland intituled "Act against irregular Baptisms and Marriages." (Note: Baptisms and Marriages Act 1695 (c. 15 (S)))
Public Accounts Act 1711 (repealed)	10 Ann. c. 11; 10 Ann. c. 8	3 March 1712
An Act to continue the Act of the last Session of Parliament, (Note: Public Accounts Act 1710 (9 Ann. c. 18)) for taking, examining, and stating, the Public Accompts of the Kingdom, for One Year longer. (Repealed by Statute Law Revision Act 1867 (30 & 31 Vict. c. 59))
Recruiting Act 1711 (repealed)	10 Ann. c. 12; 10 Ann. c. 9	3 March 1712
An Act for recruiting Her Majesty's Land Forces and Marines, for the Service of the Year One Thousand Seven Hundred and Twelve. (Repealed by Statute Law Revision Act 1867 (30 & 31 Vict. c. 59))
Mutiny Act 1711 (repealed)	10 Ann. c. 13; 10 Ann. c. 10	25 March 1712
An Act for punishing Mutiny and Desertion, and false Musters; and for the better Payment of the Army and Quarters. (Repealed by Statute Law Revision Act 1867 (30 & 31 Vict. c. 59))
Dene Causeway Act 1711 or the Great Yarmouth to Caistor Causey Act 1711	10 Ann. c. 14; 10 Ann. c. 1 Pr.	9 February 1712
An Act to make a Causeway over The Denes, from Great Yarmouth to Caister, in the County of Norfolk.
Norwich Poor Act 1711 (repealed)	10 Ann. c. 15; 10 Ann. c. 6 Pr.	22 May 1712
An Act for erecting a Workhouse in the City and County of the City of Norwich, for the better Employment and maintaining the Poor there. (Repealed by Norwich Improvement Act 1806 (46 Geo. 3. c. lxvii) and Norwich Poor Relief Act 1831 (1 & 2 Will. 4. c. li))
Kent Roads Act 1711 (repealed)	10 Ann. c. 16; 10 Ann. c. 34 Pr.	6 June 1712
An Act for enlarging, amending, and maintaining, the Road betwixt Northfleet, Gravesend, and Rochester, in the County of Kent. (Repealed by Road from Dartford to Strood Act 1822 (3 Geo. 4. c. lxx))
Whitehaven Harbour Act 1711	10 Ann. c. 17; 10 Ann. c. 3 Pr.	3 March 1712
An Act for enlarging the Term for Payment of certain Duties, granted in and by an Act of Parliament passed in the Seventh Year of Her Majesty's Reign, intituled, "An Act for preserving and enlarging the Harbour of Whitehaven, in the County of Cumberland." (Note: Whitehaven Harbour Act 1708 (7 Ann. c. 9))
Taxation Act 1711 or the Stamp Act 1712 (repealed)	10 Ann. c. 18; 10 Ann. c. 19	22 May 1712
An Act for laying several Duties upon all Soap and Paper made in Great Britain, or imported into the same; and upon chequered and striped Linens imported; and upon certain Silks, Calicoes, Linens, and Stuffs, printed, painted, or stained; and upon several Kinds of stamped Vellum, Parchment, and Paper; and upon certain printed Papers, Pamphlets, and Advertisements; for raising the Sum of Eighteen Hundred Thousand Pounds, by Way of a Lottery, towards Her Majesty's Supply; and for licensing an additional Number of Hackney Chairs; and for charging certain Stocks of Cards and Dice; and for better securing Her Majesty's Duties to arise in the Office for the Stamp Duties, by Licenses for Marriages, and otherwise; and for Relief of Persons who have not claimed their Lottery Tickets in due Time, or have lost Exchequer Bills, or Lottery Tickets; and for borrowing Money upon Stock (Part of the Capital of the South Sea Company), for the Use of the Public. (Repealed by Inland Revenue Repeal Act 1870 (33 & 34 Vict. c. 99) and Revenue Officers' Disabilities Removal Act 1874 (37 & 38 Vict. c. 22))
Customs and Excise Act 1711 (repealed)	10 Ann. c. 19; 10 Ann. c. 26	21 June 1712
An Act for laying additional Duties on Hides and Skins, Vellum, and Parchment; and new Duties on Starch, Coffee, Tea, Drugs, Gilt and Silver Wire, and Policies of Insurance, to secure a Yearly Fund, for Satisfaction of Orders to the Contributors of a further Sum of One Million Eight Hundred Thousand Pounds towards Her Majesty's Supply; and for the better securing the Duties on Candles; and for obviating Doubts concerning certain Payments in Scotland; and for suppressing unlawful Lotteries, and other Devices of the same Kind; and concerning Cake Soap; and for Relief of Mary Ravenall, in relation to an Annuity of Eighteen Pounds per Annum; and concerning Prize Cocoa Nuts brought from America; and certain Tickets, which were intended to be subscribed into the Stock of the South Sea Company; and for appropriating the Monies granted in this Session of Parliament. (Repealed by Inland Revenue Repeal Act 1870 (33 & 34 Vict. c. 99))
Churches in London and Westminster Act 1711	10 Ann. c. 20; 10 Ann. c. 11	22 May 1712
An Act for enlarging the Time given to the Commissioners appointed by Her Majesty, pursuant to an Act (Note: New Churches in London and Westminster Act 1710 (9 Ann. c. 17)) for granting to Her Majesty several Duties on Coals, for building Fifty new Churches in and about the Cities of London and Westm'r, and Suburbs thereof, and other Purposes therein mentioned; and also for giving the said Commissioners farther Powers for better effecting the same; and for appointing Monies for re-building the Parish Church of St. Mary Woolnoth, in the City of London.
Church Patronage (Scotland) Act 1711 or the Patronage Act 1711 (repealed)	10 Ann. c. 21; 10 Ann. c. 12	22 May 1712
An Act to restore the Patrons to their ancient Rights of presenting Ministers to the Churches vacant in that Part of Great Britain called Scotland. (Repealed by Church Patronage (Scotland) Act 1874 (37 & 38 Vict. c. 82))
Yule Vacance Act 1711 (repealed)	10 Ann. c. 22; 10 Ann. c. 13	22 May 1712
An Act for repealing Part of an Act passed in the Parliament of Scotland, intituled, "Act for discharging the Yule Vacance." (Note: Yule Vacance Act 1690 (c. 52 (S))) (Repealed by Yule Vacance Act 1714 (1 Geo. 1. St. 2. c. 28))
Linen Manufacture (Scotland) Act 1711 (repealed)	10 Ann. c. 23; 10 Ann. c. 21	22 May 1712
An Act to prevent Abuses in making Linen Cloth, and regulating the Lengths, Breadths, and equal sorting of Yarn, for each Piece made in Scotland; and for whitening the same. (Repealed by Linen and Hempen Manufactures (Scotland) Act 1823 (4 Geo. 4. c. 40))
Continuance of Laws Act 1711 (repealed)	10 Ann. c. 24; 10 Ann. c. 14	22 May 1712
An Act for the reviving and continuing several Acts therein mentioned, for the preventing Mischiefs which may happen by Fire; for building and repairing County Gaols; for exempting Apothecaries from serving Parish and Ward Offices, and serving upon Juries; and relating to the returning of Jurors. (Repealed by Statute Law Revision Act 1867 (30 & 31 Vict. c. 59) (Note: Incorrectly cited as "SLR 1897" in the Chronological Table of the Statutes.))
Bankrupts Act 1711 (repealed)	10 Ann. c. 25; 10 Ann. c. 15	22 May 1712
An Act for repealing a Clause in the Statute made in the Twenty-first Year of the Reign of King James the First, intituled, "An Act for the further Description of a Bankrupt, and Relief of Creditors against such as shall become Bankrupts; and for inflicting Corporal Punishment upon the Bankrupts, in some special Cases," (Note: Bankrupts Act 1623 (21 Jas. 1. c. 19)) which makes Descriptions of Bankrupts; and for the Explanation of the Laws relating to Bankruptcy, in case of Partnership. (Repealed by Bankruptcy Act 1825 (6 Geo. 4. c. 16))
Woollen Manufacture Act 1711 (repealed)	10 Ann. c. 26; 10 Ann. c. 16	22 May 1712
An Act for regulating, improving, and encouraging, the Woollen Manufacture of mixed or medley Broad Cloth; and for the Payment of the Poor employed therein. (Repealed by Woollen Manufacture Act 1809 (49 Geo. 3. c. 109))
Greenwich Hospital, etc. Act 1711 (repealed)	10 Ann. c. 27; 10 Ann. c. 17	22 May 1712
An Act for better collecting and recovering the Duties granted for the Support of the Royal Hospital at Greenwich; and for the further Benefit thereof; and for preserving Her Majesty's Harbour Moorings. (Repealed by Greenwich Hospital Act 1834 (4 & 5 Will. 4. c. 34))
Pleading Act 1711 (repealed)	10 Ann. c. 28; 10 Ann. c. 18	22 May 1712
An Act to give further time for inrolling such leases granted from the crown, as have not be inrolled within the respective times therein limited; and for making the pleading of Deeds of Bargain and Sale enrolled and of Fee Farm Rents more easie. (Repealed by Law of Property (Amendment) Act 1924 (15 & 16 Geo. 5. c. 5))
Insolvent Debtors' Relief Act 1711 (repealed)	10 Ann. c. 29; 10 Ann. c. 20	22 May 1712
An Act for the Relief of Insolvent Debtors, by obliging their Creditors to accept the utmost Satisfaction they are capable to make, and restoring them to their Liberty. (Repealed by Statute Law Revision Act 1867 (30 & 31 Vict. c. 59))
Importation of Prize Goods Act 1711 (repealed)	10 Ann. c. 30; 10 Ann. c. 22	22 May 1712
An Act for the Relief of Merchants importing Prize Goods from America. (Repealed by Naval Prize Acts Repeal Act 1864 (27 & 28 Vict. c. 23))
Elections (Fraudulent Conveyances) Act 1711 (repealed)	10 Ann. c. 31; 10 Ann. c. 23	22 May 1712
An Act for the more effectual preventing fraudulent Conveyances, in order to multiply Votes for electing Knights of Shires to serve in Parliament. (Repealed by Statute Law Revision Act 1867 (30 & 31 Vict. c. 59) and Representation of the People Act 1918 (7 & 8 Geo. 5. c. 64))
Minehead Harbour Act 1711 (repealed)	10 Ann. c. 32; 10 Ann. c. 24	22 May 1712
An Act for prolonging the Term for Payment of certain Duties, granted by an Act made in the Twelfth and Thirteenth Years of His late Majesty King William, intituled, "An Act for recovering, securing, and keeping in Repair, the Harbour of Minehead, for the Benefit and Support of the Navigation and Trade of this Kingdom." (Note: Minehead Harbour Act 1700 (12 & 13 Will. 3. c. 9)) (Repealed by Minehead Pier and Harbour Act 1823 (4 Geo. 4. c. cxiii) and Watchet Harbour Act 1857 (20 & 21 Vict. c. cxli) (Note: Incorrectly cited as "20-1 V c xli" in the Chronological Table of the Statutes; 20 & 21 Vict. c. xli is the Ely Valley Railway Act 1857.))
Militia, etc. Act 1711 (repealed)	10 Ann. c. 33; 10 Ann. c. 25	22 May 1712
An Act for raising the Militia for the Year One Thousand Seven Hundred and Twelve, although the Month's Pay formerly advanced be not re-paid; and for rectifying a Mistake in an Act passed this Session of Parliament, intituled, "An Act for punishing Mutiny and Desertion, and false Musters; and for the better Payment of the Army and Quarters;" (Note: Mutiny Act 1711 (10 Ann. c. 13)) and for taking Accompts of Trophy-money formerly raised and collected. (Repealed by Statute Law Revision Act 1867 (30 & 31 Vict. c. 59))
African Company Act 1711 (repealed)	10 Ann. c. 34; 10 Ann. c. 27	6 June 1712
An Act for making effectual such Agreement as shall be made between the Royal African Company of England and their Creditors. (Repealed by Statute Law Revision Act 1867 (30 & 31 Vict. c. 59))
East India Company Act 1711 (repealed)	10 Ann. c. 35; 10 Ann. c. 28	21 June 1712
An Act for continuing the Trade and Corporation-capacity of the United East India Company, although their Fund should be redeemed. (Repealed by Statute Law Revision Act 1867 (30 & 31 Vict. c. 59))
Importation Act 1711 (repealed)	10 Ann. c. 36; 10 Ann. c. 29	21 June 1712
An Act for better ascertaining and securing the Payments to be made to Her Majesty, for Goods and Merchandizes to be imported from The East Indies, and other Places within the Limits of the Charter granted to the East India Company. (Repealed by Customs Law Repeal Act 1825 (6 Geo. 4. c. 105))
South Sea Company Act 1711 (repealed)	10 Ann. c. 37; 10 Ann. c. 30	21 June 1712
An Act for continuing the Trade to the South Seas, granted by an Act of the last Session of Parliament, (Note: Stamps Act 1710 (9 Ann. c. 15)) although the Capital Stock of the said Corporation should be redeemed. (Repealed by Statute Law Revision Act 1867 (30 & 31 Vict. c. 59))
Debts due to the Army Act 1711 (repealed)	10 Ann. c. 38; 10 Ann. c. 31	21 June 1712
An Act for appointing Commissioners, to take, examine, and determine, the Debts due to the Army, Transport Service, and Sick and Wounded. (Repealed by Statute Law Revision Act 1867 (30 & 31 Vict. c. 59))
Oaths, Scotland Act 1711 (repealed)	10 Ann. c. 39; 10 Ann. c. 32	21 June 1712
An Act for enlarging the Time for the Ministers, Advocates, and other Members of the College of Justice, in Scotland, to take the Oaths therein mentioned. (Repealed by Statute Law Revision Act 1867 (30 & 31 Vict. c. 59))
Circuits Courts Act 1711 (repealed)	10 Ann. c. 40; 10 Ann. c. 33	21 June 1712
An Act for the appointing the Circuit Courts in that Part of Great Britain called Scotland to be kept only Once in the Year. (Repealed by Statute Law Revision Act 1867 (30 & 31 Vict. c. 59))
Sufferers in the West Indies Act 1711 (repealed)	10 Ann. c. 41; 10 Ann. c. 34	21 June 1712
An Act for explaining several Clauses in an Act passed the last Session of Parliament, (Note: Stamps (No. 2) Act 1710 (9 Ann. c. 16)) for Relief of the Sufferers of the Islands of Nevis and St. Christopher, by reason of the Invasion of the French there, in the Year One Thousand Seven Hundred and Five. (Repealed by Statute Law Revision Act 1867 (30 & 31 Vict. c. 59))
Suffolk Roads Act 1711 (repealed)	10 Ann. c. 42; 10 Ann. c. 9 Pr.	22 May 1712
An Act for the better repairing and amending the Road leading from Ipswich to Cleydon, and the Road called The Pye Road, in the County of Suffolk. (Repealed by Ipswich and Yaxley Roads Act 1793 (33 Geo. 3. c. 128))
Deal Chapel of Ease Act 1711 (repealed)	10 Ann. c. 43; 10 Ann. c. 11 Pr.	22 May 1712
An Act for compleating a Chapel of Ease in the Lower Town of Deal, (Note: St. George's Church, Deal.) in the County of Kent, by a Duty on Water-borne Coals to be brought into the said Town. (Repealed by Statute Law (Repeals) Act 1973 (c. 39))
Boston Water Act 1711 (repealed)	10 Ann. c. 44; 10 Ann. c. 10 Pr.	22 May 1712
An Act for the better supplying the Town of Boston, in the County of Lincoln, with fresh Water. (Repealed by Statute Law Revision Act 1948 (11 & 12 Geo. 6. c. 62))
Oxford and Cambridge Regius Professorships of Divinity Act 1711	10 Ann. c. 45 (Note: Also listed as 10 Ann. c. 4 Pr.); 10 Ann. c. 12 Pr.	22 May 1712
An Act for confirming and rendering more effectual certain Letters Patents of King James the First, for annexing a Canonry and several Rectories to the Regius Professor of Divinity in the University of Oxford, and to the Regius Professor and Lady Margaret's Reader of Divinity in the University of Cambridge.

=== Private acts ===
Short title	Citation	Royal assent
Long title
Baron of Stitnham's Estate Act 1711	10 Ann. c. 1 Pr.	9 February 1712
An Act to enable John Lord Gower, Baron of Stit'nham, an Infant, to make a Settlement upon his Marriage.
Wrothesley Duke of Bedford and his brother Lord John Russell's estate: enabling trustees during their minority to grant leases and setts for getting copper and other ore and minerals, and validating existing grants or setts.	10 Ann. c. 2 Pr.	25 March 1712
An Act to enable Trustees, during the Minority of Wriothesly Duke of Bedford, and of the Lord John Russell his Brother, to grant Leases of the Estate of the said Duke, and Setts for getting Copper and other Ore and Minerals therein; and for rendering valid and effectual several such Grants or Setts already made.
Lord Annesley's Estate Act 1711	10 Ann. c. 3 Pr.	25 March 1712
An Act for making the Exemplification of the Settlement made upon the Marriage of James Lord Annesley with the Lady Elizabeth Manners, under the Great Seal of Great Britain, Evidence on Hearings in Equity and Trials at Law.
Oxford and Cambridge Regius Professorships of Divinity Act 1711	10 Ann. c. 4 Pr. (Note: Also listed as 10 Ann. c. 45)	22 May 1712
An Act for confirming and rendering more effectual certain Letters Patents of King James the First, for annexing a Canonry and several Rectories to the Regius Professor of Divinity in the University of Oxford, and to the Regius Professor and Lady Margaret's Reader of Divinity in the University of Cambridge.
Debts of James Griffin Act 1711	10 Ann. c. 5 Pr.	22 May 1712
An Act for enabling James Griffin Esquire, and Edward Griffin Son and Heir Apparent of the said James Griffin, to raise Money, to pay the Debts of the said James; and to make a Settlement, for the Benefit of themselves and their Family.
Grevile's Estate Act 1711	10 Ann. c. 6 Pr.	22 May 1712
An Act to enable the Honourable Algernon Grevile Esquire to make a Settlement of his Estate, in the several Counties of York and Warwick, pursuant to Agreements made by him on his Marriage with the Honourable Mary Somerset his now Wife.
Guldeford's Estate Act 1711	10 Ann. c. 7 Pr.	22 May 1712
An Act for Sale of the Manor of Hempsted, and other Lands therein mentioned, lying in the Counties of Kent and Sussex, the Estate of Sir Robert Guldeford Baronet, for the Payment of Debts; and for settling the Camber Farm, and other Lands in the said County of Sussex, to the same Uses as the said Manor of Hempsted now stands settled.
Ascertaining and establishing glebe land, tithes and other profits of the rectory of Gothurst (Buckinghamshire).	10 Ann. c. 8 Pr.	22 May 1712
An Act for ascertaining and establishing the Glebe Land, Tithes, and other Profits, of the Rectory of Gothurst, in the County of Bucks.
Patrick's Estate Act 1711	10 Ann. c. 9 Pr.	22 May 1712
An Act for Sale of the Manor of Dalham, and other Manors and Hereditaments, in the County of Suffolk, and elsewhere, late the Estate of Symon Patrick Clerk, deceased, for the several Purposes therein mentioned.
Egerton's Estate Act 1711	10 Ann. c. 10 Pr.	22 May 1712
An Act for Sale of the Manors of Agardesley, alias Agersley, and Marchington, and several Lands and Hereditaments, in the County of Stafford, for Payment of the Mortgage-monies charged thereon, and other the Debts of the Honourable Charles Egerton Esquire.
Henley's Estate Act 1711	10 Ann. c. 11 Pr.	22 May 1712
An Act to enable Trustees to cut and sell Timber on the Estate late of Anthony Henley Esquire, deceased; and for applying the Money thereby arising, towards Payment of his Younger Children's Portions, provided by his Marriage Settlement; and also for transferring certain Estates, by the same Settlement now vested in Richard Norton Esquire, to other Trustees, on the same Trusts.
Perpetual augmentation to Duloe (Cornwall) vicarage out of tithes and profits of Duloe rectory.	10 Ann. c. 12 Pr.	22 May 1712
An Act for making a perpetual Augmentation to the Vicarage of Duloe, in the County of Cornwall, out of the Tithes and Profits of the Rectory of Duloe.
Hill's Estate Act 1711	10 Ann. c. 13 Pr.	22 May 1712
An Act for Sale of Part of the Estate late of Edw'd Hill Esquire, deceased, in Orton and Rowell, in the County of Northampton, for the discharging several Incumbrances thereupon, and the Performance of the last Will of the said Edward Hill; and for the settling of other Lands and Tenements, in Rowell aforesaid, in Lieu thereof, to the same Uses.
Southwell's Estate Act 1711	10 Ann. c. 14 Pr.	22 May 1712
An Act for enabling Edward Southwell Esquire to grant certain Houses and Lands, in the County of Gloucester, to Joshua Franklyn, of Bristol, Merchant, for a Term of Years, in order to the better Improvement thereof, and of other adjacent Lands of the said Edward Southwell.
Bromsall's Estate Act 1711	10 Ann. c. 15 Pr.	22 May 1712
An Act to enable Owen Thomas Bromsall Gentleman to sell divers Lands, Tenements, and Hereditaments, in the County of Bedford, for the Purposes therein mentioned.
Vanhomrigh's Estate Act 1711	10 Ann. c. 16 Pr.	22 May 1712
An Act for vesting the Estate late of Bartholomew Van Homrigh Esquire, deceased, lying in the Kingdom of Ireland, in Trustees, to be sold.
Sale of lands, part of the manor of Wightfield alias Whitefield, and other lands in Gloucestershire for payment of debts of Mary Fermor and of John More and his wife Margaret.	10 Ann. c. 17 Pr.	22 May 1712
An Act for selling certain Lands, Part of the Manor of Wightfield, alias Whitefield, and other Lands in the County of Gloucester, for the Payment of the Debts heretofore of Mary Fermor Widow, deceased, and of John More junior, of Kirtlington, in the County of Nottingham, Esquire, and Margaret his Wife.
Western's Estate Act 1711	10 Ann. c. 18 Pr.	22 May 1712
An Act to enable William Western Esquire, an Infant, to make a Settlement of his Estate upon his Marriage, notwithstanding his Infancy.
Gomeldon's Estate Act 1711	10 Ann. c. 19 Pr.	22 May 1712
An Act for Sale of the Manors of North Court and Boynton, in the Parish of Swingfield, in the County of Kent, Part of the Estate of Richard Gomeldon Esquire, for discharging Incumbrances.
Vesey's Estate Act 1711	10 Ann. c. 20 Pr.	22 May 1712
An Act for confirming to Agmondisham Vesey Esquire, and his Children, the Benefit intended by an Act passed in the First Year of Her Majesty's Reign, (Note: Vesey's Estate Act 1702 (1 Ann. St. 2. c. 25 Pr.)) for their Relief; and for discharging him and them of the Rents and Profits of their Estate, incurred before the passing of the said Act.
Explanation of an Act empowering the Treasury to compound with the sureties of Samuel Pacey late Receiver General for Suffolk so far as it relates to one of his sureties.	10 Ann. c. 21 Pr.	22 May 1712
An Act to explain an Act made in the Seventh Year of Her Majesty's Reign, intituled, An Act to empower the Lord High Treasurer of Great Britain, or Commissioners of the Treasury, to compound with the Sureties of Samuel Pacey, deceased, late Receiver General of the County of Suffolk, (Note: 7 Ann. c. 18 Pr.) so far as it relates to Joseph Pake, One of the said Sureties.
Enabling the Treasury to compound with the executor of Michael Wicks late Receiver General of the Plantation Duties in the Port of London as it was by a former Act enabled to do with Michael Wicks himself.	10 Ann. c. 22 Pr.	22 May 1712
An Act to enable the Lord High Treasurer, or Commissioners of the Treasury of Great Britain, for the Time being, to compound with the Executor of Michael Wicks Esquire, late Receiver General of the Plantation Duties in the Port of London, as the Lord High Treasurer, or Commissioners of the Treasury of England, were, by a former Act of Parliament, (Note: 3 & 4 Ann. c. 61 Pr.) enabled to do with the said Michael Wicks himself.
Freedom of the ship "Content Galley," taken from the French and condemned as prize.	10 Ann. c. 23 Pr.	22 May 1712
An Act to make free The Content Galley, a running Ship, taken from the French, and condemned as Prize.
Freedom of the Ship Success Act 1711	10 Ann. c. 24 Pr.	22 May 1712
An Act for making the Ship Success a free Ship.
Thorndon and Ingrave Unification Act 1711	10 Ann. c. 25 Pr.	6 June 1712
An Act for uniting the Parish Churches of Thorndon and Ingrave, in the County of Essex.
Vyner's Estate Act 1711	10 Ann. c. 26 Pr.	6 June 1712
An Act to vest several Lands and Tenements, in the County of Warwick, the Estate of Thomas Vyner, late of Ethrop, in the said County, Esquire, deceased, in Trustees; and to enable them to sell Part thereof, for discharging several Debts and Incumbrances thereon; and to raise a present Provision for his Son and Heir, an Infant, and the rest of his Children.
Million Lottery Tickets Act 1711 (repealed)	10 Ann. c. 27 Pr.	6 June 1712
An Act to empower the Paymaster of the Million Lottery Tickets to pay to Sir William Hodges Baronet the Money due upon Fourteen Tickets in the said Lottery. (Repealed by Statute Law (Repeals) Act 2013 (c. 2))
Relief of George Mathew against a clause in an Act passed in Ireland whereby fines, recoveries and a settlement of his late wife's estate are set aside.	10 Ann. c. 28 Pr.	6 June 1712
An Act for Relief of George Mathew Esquire, against a Clause in an Act of Parliament passed in Ireland, (Note: 8 Anne c. 3 (I), explaining and amending an Act to prevent the further growth of popery) whereby several Fines and Recoveries, and a Settlement of his late Wife's Estate, are set aside.
Peirson's Estate Act 1711	10 Ann. c. 29 Pr.	6 June 1712
An Act for Sale of the Estate of William Peirson Esquire, deceased, for Payment of an Incumbrance thereupon, and a Debt due from the said William Peirson to Her Majesty, as he was Collector of the Customs at Plymouth.
Hillersdon's Estate Act 1711	10 Ann. c. 30 Pr.	6 June 1712
An Act for vesting several Lands in Battlesdon, in the County of Bedford, in John Hillersdon Esquire, and his Heirs, discharged of several Uses and Estates to which they are now limited; and for settling other Lands, of greater Value, in the same County, to the same Uses.
Enabling James Duke of Ormond and Charles Earl of Arran, his brother, to convey to the Crown the regalities, franchises, liberties and jurisdictions in the county of Tipperary, and enabling the Crown to grant an equivalent for them.	10 Ann. c. 31 Pr.	21 June 1712
An Act to enable James Duke of Ormonde, and Charles Earl of Arran of the Kingdom of Ireland his Brother, to convey to Her Majesty the Regalities, Franchises, Liberties, and Jurisdictions, in the County of Tiperary, in the Kingdom of Ireland, in order to their being extinguished in the Crown; and to enable Her Majesty to grant an Equivalent for the same.
Lord Bellew's Estate Act 1711	10 Ann. c. 32 Pr.	21 June 1712
An Act for enlarging the Time for Sale of Part of the Estate of the Right Honourable Richard Lord Bellew of the Kingdom of Ireland, vested in Trustees by an Act of Parliament lately passed in the said Kingdom. (Note: 8 Anne c. 2 Pr. (I), enabling Richard Lord Bellew to sell part for discharge of debts and incumbrances and settling the residue on himself for life with remainder to his protestant issue, subject to an enlargement of the jointure settled on his wife, the Countess of Newburgh)
Relief of Lieutenant General Sir William Douglas Act 1711	10 Ann. c. 33 Pr.	21 June 1712
An Act for the Relief of Sir William Douglas, Lieutenant General of Her Majesty's Forces.
Austen's Estate Act 1711	10 Ann. c. 34 Pr.	21 June 1712
An Act for vesting the Inheritance of the Manor of Court at Weeke, and divers other Lands, Tenements, and Hereditaments, in the County of Kent, in Trustees, to be sold, for Payment of the Debts and Legacies of Sir Robert Austen Baronet, deceased.
William and Mary Pynsent's and John and Elizabeth Trevillian's estates in Somerset: confirmation of a partition.	10 Ann. c. 35 Pr.	21 June 1712
An Act for confirming of a Partition made between William Pynsent Esquire and Mary his Wife, John Trevillian Esquire and Elizabeth his Wife, and their Trustees, of several Manors and Lands in the County of Somerset.
May's Estate Act 1711	10 Ann. c. 36 Pr.	21 June 1712
An Act for Sale of some Part of the Real Estate of Baptist May Esquire, deceased, for Payment of his Debts; and for other Purposes therein mentioned.
Moore's Estate Act 1711	10 Ann. c. 37 Pr.	21 June 1712
An Act for Sale of the Estate of Francis Moore Esquire, in the County of Wilts, for discharging an Incumbrance thereon; and for providing a Portion for his only Daughter, and other Purposes therein mentioned.
Netherex, Rew, Silverton and Thorveton (Devon): sale of lands.	10 Ann. c. 38 Pr.	21 June 1712
An Act for vesting several Lands, in Netherex, Rew, Silverton, and Thorverton, in the County of Devon, in Trustees, to be sold, for the Purposes therein mentioned.
Chetwynd's Estate Act 1711	10 Ann. c. 39 Pr.	21 June 1712
An Act for vesting in Trustees the Real Estate of Barbara sole Daughter and Heir of John Goring, late of the City of Litchfield, Esquire, and now the Wife of Mr. Walter Chetwynd, for the Performance of Articles on her Marriage, notwithstanding her Minority.
Confirmation of Jeffrey and Robert Palmer's lease for further provision for payment of Jeffrey's debts.	10 Ann. c. 40 Pr.	21 June 1712
An Act for confirming a Lease made by Jeffery Palmer and Robert Palmer Esquires, for a farther Provision for Payment of the Debts of the said Jeffery Palmer.
Enabling the Treasury to compound with George Dixon surety for his father while Receiver General for Somerset and Bristol.	10 Ann. c. 41 Pr.	21 June 1712
An Act to enable the Lord High Treasurer of Great Britain, or Commissioners of the Treasury, for the Time being, to compound with George Dixon Doctor in Divinity, as he was Surety for his Father, while Receiver General for the County of Somerset and City of Bristol.

=== Sources ===
- Raithby, John, ed. (1822). "Anno 10° Annæ, A.D. 1711". The Statutes of the Realm. Vol. 9: The Statutes of the Seventh to the Thirteenth Years of the Reign of Queen Anne. pp. 509–722 – via Internet Archive.
- Raithby, John, ed. (1822). "Anno 10° Annæ, A.D. 1711". The Statutes of the Realm. Vol. 9: The Statutes of the Seventh to the Thirteenth Years of the Reign of Queen Anne. pp. 509–722 – via HathiTrust.
- Pickering, Danby, ed. (1764). "Anno decimo Annæ". The Statutes at Large. Vol. 12: From The Eighth to the Twelfth Year of Queen Anne. Cambridge: Joseph Bentham. p. 279-458 – via Internet Archive.
- Journals of the House of Commons. Vol. 17. London: His Majesty's Stationery Office. 1803. pp. 1–276 – via Google Books.
- Chronological Table of and Index to the Statutes. Vol. 1: To the End of the Session 59 Vict. Sess. 2 (1895) (13th ed.). London: Her Majesty's Stationery Office. 1896. p. 90-91 – via Google Books.
- "Acts of the Parliament of Great Britain from 1711". legislation.gov.uk. The National Archives.

== See also ==
- List of acts of the Parliament of Great Britain
