= Christmas in Scotland =

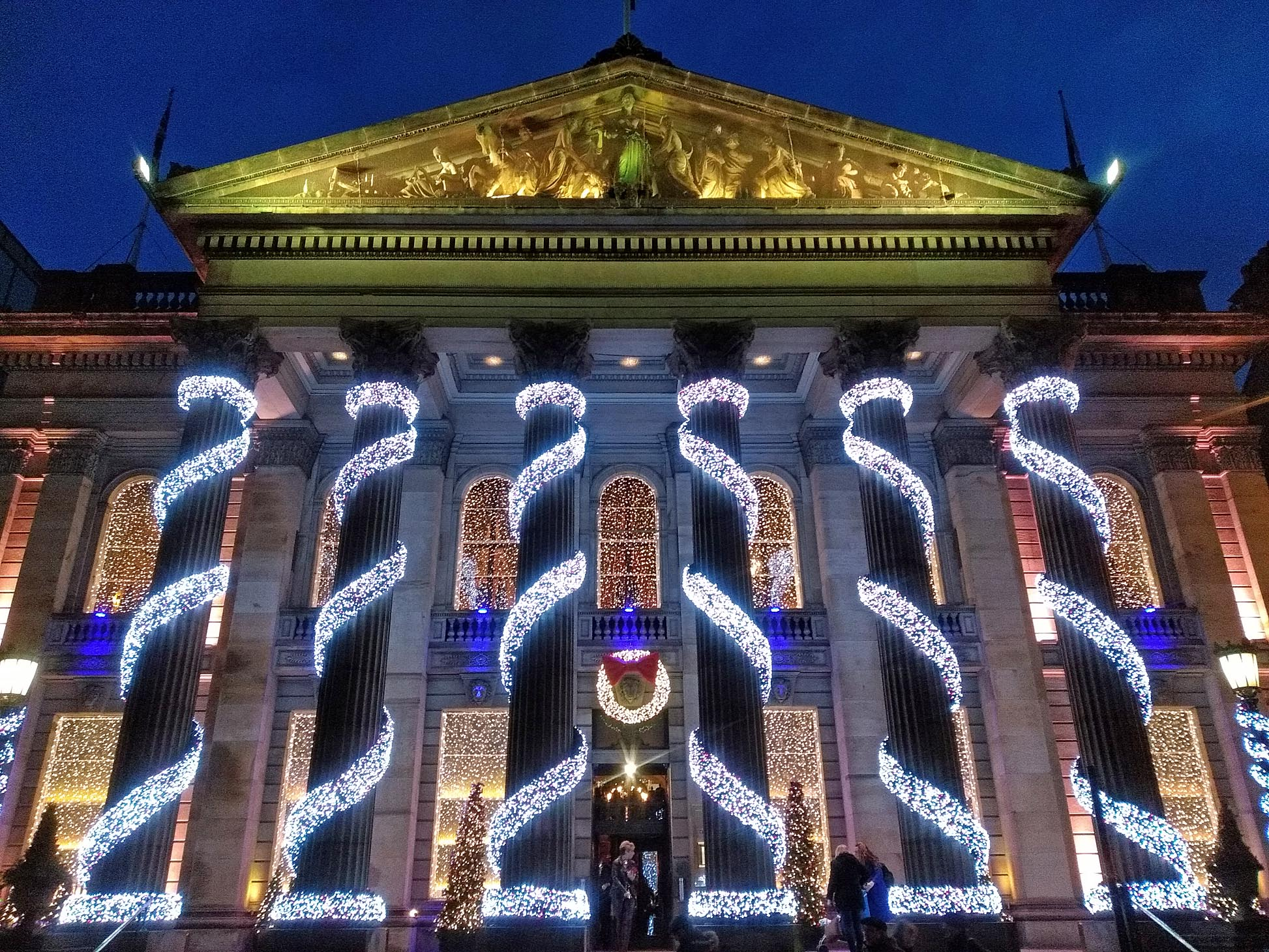
Christmas lights at The Dome, Edinburgh

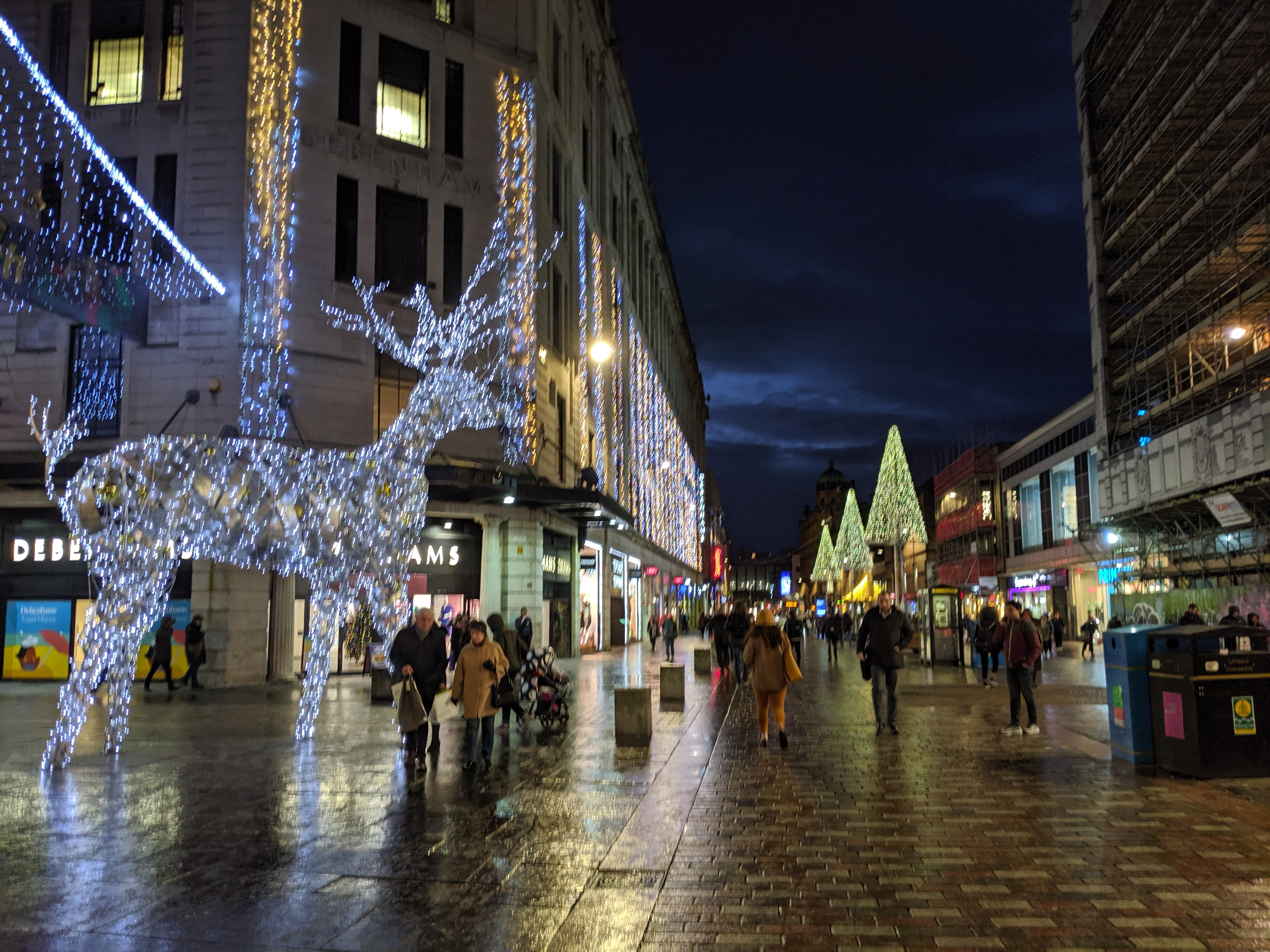
Street decorations in Glasgow

Prior to the Reformation of 1560, Christmas in Scotland, then called "Yule" (alternative spellings include Yhoill, Yuil, Ȝule and Ȝoull; see Yogh) or in Gaelic-speaking areas "Nollaig", was celebrated in a similar fashion to the rest of Catholic Europe. Calderwood recorded that in 1545, a few months before his murder, Cardinal Beaton had "passed over the Christmasse dayes with games and feasting". However, the Reformation transformed attitudes to traditional Christian feasting days, including Christmas, and led in practice to the abolition of festival days and other church holidays, the Kirk and the state being closely linked in Scotland during the Late Middle Ages and the Early Modern period. A 1640 act of the Parliament of Scotland abolished the "Yule vacation and all observation thereof in time coming".

== Post-Reformation suppression of Yule Tide celebrations ==
Yule Vacance Act 1640
- Act of Parliament
- Parliament of Scotland
- Long title: Act dischairging the Yule vacance, appointing the session to sit doun the first of November and ryse the last of Februar, and to sit doune the first of June and ryise the last of Julii.
- Citation: June 1640 c. 7
- Territorial extent: Scotland

Dates
- Royal assent: 5 June 1640
Other legislation
Repealed by	Rescissory Act 1661
Relates to	Yule Vacance Act 1711

Status: Rescinded

Yule Vacance Act 1690
- Act of Parliament
- Parliament of Scotland
- Long title: Act discharging the Yule Vacance.
- Citation: April 1690 c. 52
- Territorial extent: Scotland

Dates
- Royal assent: 19 July 1690
- Repealed: 7 December 1711
Other legislation
Repealed by	Yule Vacance Act 1711

Status: Repealed

Two acts of the Estates of Parliament — the Yule Vacance Act 1640 (Act discharging the Yule vacance) (5 June 1640) and the Yule Vacance Act 1690 (April c. 52) Act dischargeing the Yule vacance (15 April 1690)— abolished the Yule Vacance (Christmas recess).

Yule Vacance Act 1686
- Act of Parliament
- Parliament of Scotland
- Long title: Act for the Christmas Vacance.
- Citation: 1686 c. 7
- Territorial extent: Scotland

Dates
- Royal assent: 24 May 1686
Other legislation
Repealed by	Statute Law Repeal (No. 3) Act 1690
Relates to	Yule Vacance Act 1711

Status: Repealed

The first act was partly repealed by the Yule Vacance Act 1686 (c. 7), when Episcopalianism was briefly in ascendancy within the Kirk.

Yule Vacance Act 1711
- Act of Parliament
- Parliament of Great Britain
- Long title: An Act for repealing Part of an Act passed in the Parliament of Scotland, intituled, "Act for discharging the Yule Vacance."
- Citation: 10 Ann. c. 22 (Note: This is the citation in The Statutes of the Realm.); 10 Ann. c. 12 (Note: This is the citation in The Statutes at Large.)
- Territorial extent: Great Britain

Dates
- Royal assent: 22 May 1712
- Commencement: 7 December 1711 (Note: Start of session.)
- Repealed: 17 March 1715
Other legislation
Repeals/revokes	Yule Vacance Act 1690
Repealed by	Yule Vacance Act 1714
Relates to	Yule Vacance Act 1640; Yule Vacance Act 1686

Status: Repealed

Text of statute as originally enacted

Yule Vacance Act 1714
- Act of Parliament
- Parliament of Great Britain
- Long title: An act for repealing an act, intituled, "An act for repealing part of an act passed in the parliament of Scotland, intituled, 'Act for discharging the Yule vacance.'"
- Citation: 1 Geo. 1. St. 2. c. 28
- Territorial extent: Great Britain

Dates
- Royal assent: 21 September 1715
- Commencement: 17 March 1715
- Repealed: 15 July 1867
Other legislation
Repeals/revokes	Yule Vacance Act 1711
Repealed by	Statute Law Revision Act 1867

Status: Repealed

Text of statute as originally enacted

The second act was partly repealed in 1712 by the Yule Vacance Act 1711 (10 Ann. c. 22) of the Parliament of Great Britain.

The third act was repealed by the Yule Vacance Act 1714 (1 Geo. 1. St. 2. c. 28).

The 1640 act stated (in Middle Scots):

"... the kirke within this kingdome is now purged of all superstitious observatione of dayes... thairfor the saidis estatis have dischairged and simply dischairges the foirsaid Yule vacance and all observation thairof in tymecomeing, and rescindis and annullis all acts, statutis and warrandis and ordinances whatsoevir granted at any tyme heirtofoir for keiping of the said Yule vacance, with all custome of observatione thairof, and findis and declaires the samene to be extinct, voyd and of no force nor effect in tymecomeing."

English translation:
"... the kirk within this kingdom is now purged of all superstitious observation of days... therefore the said estates have discharged and simply discharge the foresaid Yule vacation and all observation thereof in time coming, and rescind and annul all acts, statutes and warrants and ordinances whatsoever granted at any time heretofore for keeping of the said Yule vacation, with all custom of observation thereof, and find and declare the same to be extinct, void and of no force nor effect in time coming."

Robert Jamieson recorded the opinion of an English clergyman regarding the post-reformation suppression of Christmas:

"The ministers of Scotland, in contempt of the holy-day observed by England, cause their wives and servants to spin in open sight of the people upon Yule day, and their affectionate auditors constrain their servants to yoke their plough on Yule day, in contempt of Christ's nativity. Which our Lord has not left unpunished, for their oxen ran wud, and brak their necks and lamed some ploughmen, which is notoriously known in some parts of Scotland."

== Daft Days ==
The period of festivities running from Christmas to Handsel Monday, including Hogmanay and Ne'erday, is known as the Daft Days.

== Post-war period ==
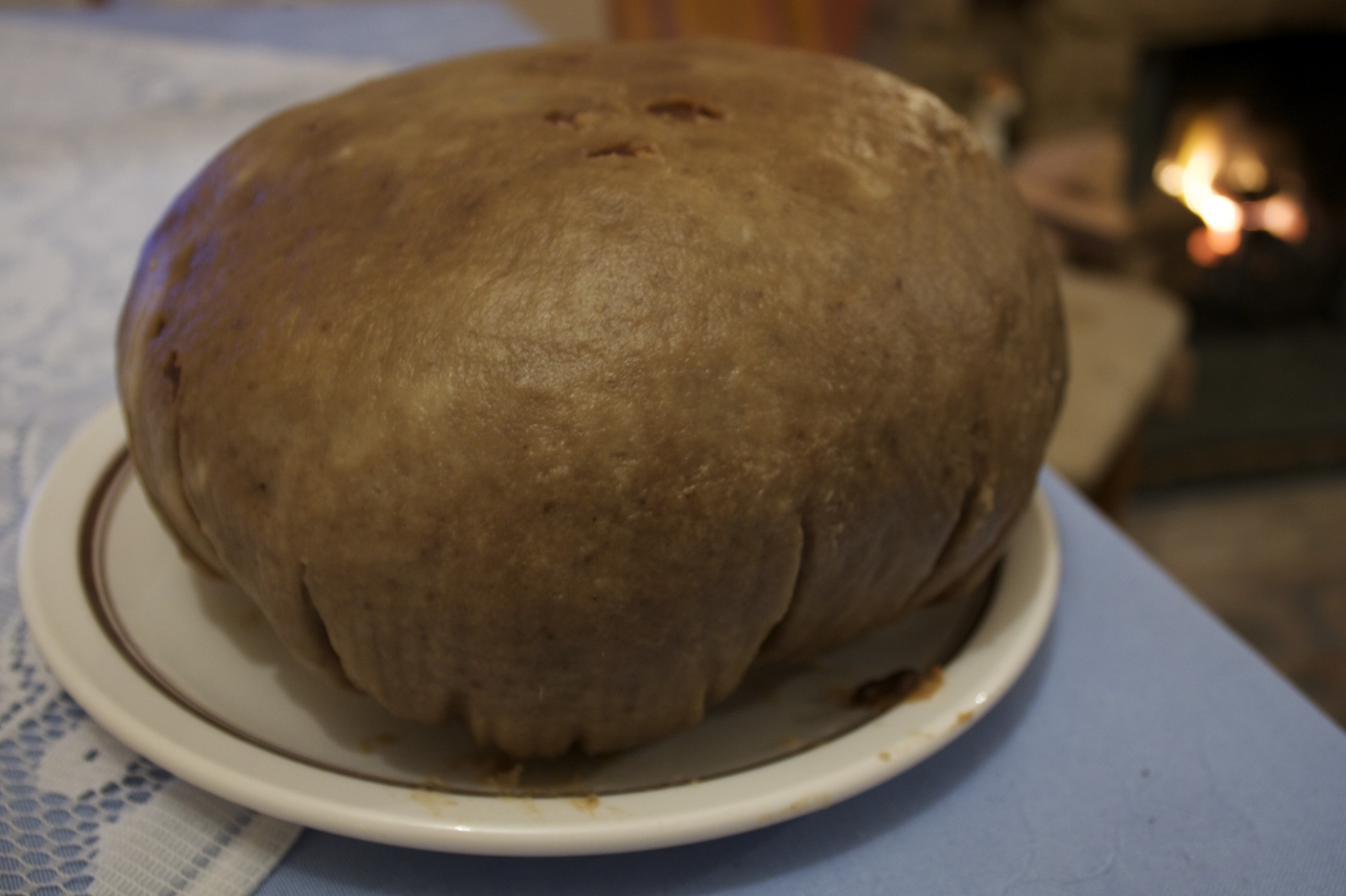
Clootie dumpling

Christmas in Scotland was traditionally observed very quietly because of the various Acts (listed above) that had suppressed Christmas celebrations in Scotland after the Reformation.

Christmas Day was made a public holiday in 1958 in Scotland, Boxing Day only in 1974. The New Year's Eve festivity, Hogmanay, was by far the largest celebration in Scotland. The giftgiving, public holidays and feasting associated with mid-winter were traditionally held between 11 December and 6 January. However, since the 1980s, the fading of the Church's influence and the increased influences from the rest of the United Kingdom and elsewhere, Christmas and its related festivities are now nearly on par with, or surpass, Hogmanay and Ne'erday. Edinburgh, Glasgow and other cities now have traditional German Christmas markets from late November until Christmas Eve.

== See also ==
- Auld Lang Syne
- Five Articles of Perth
- Little Christmas
- Taladh Chriosda
- Up Helly Aa
