= 4th Parliament of Great Britain =

←	3rd	5th	→
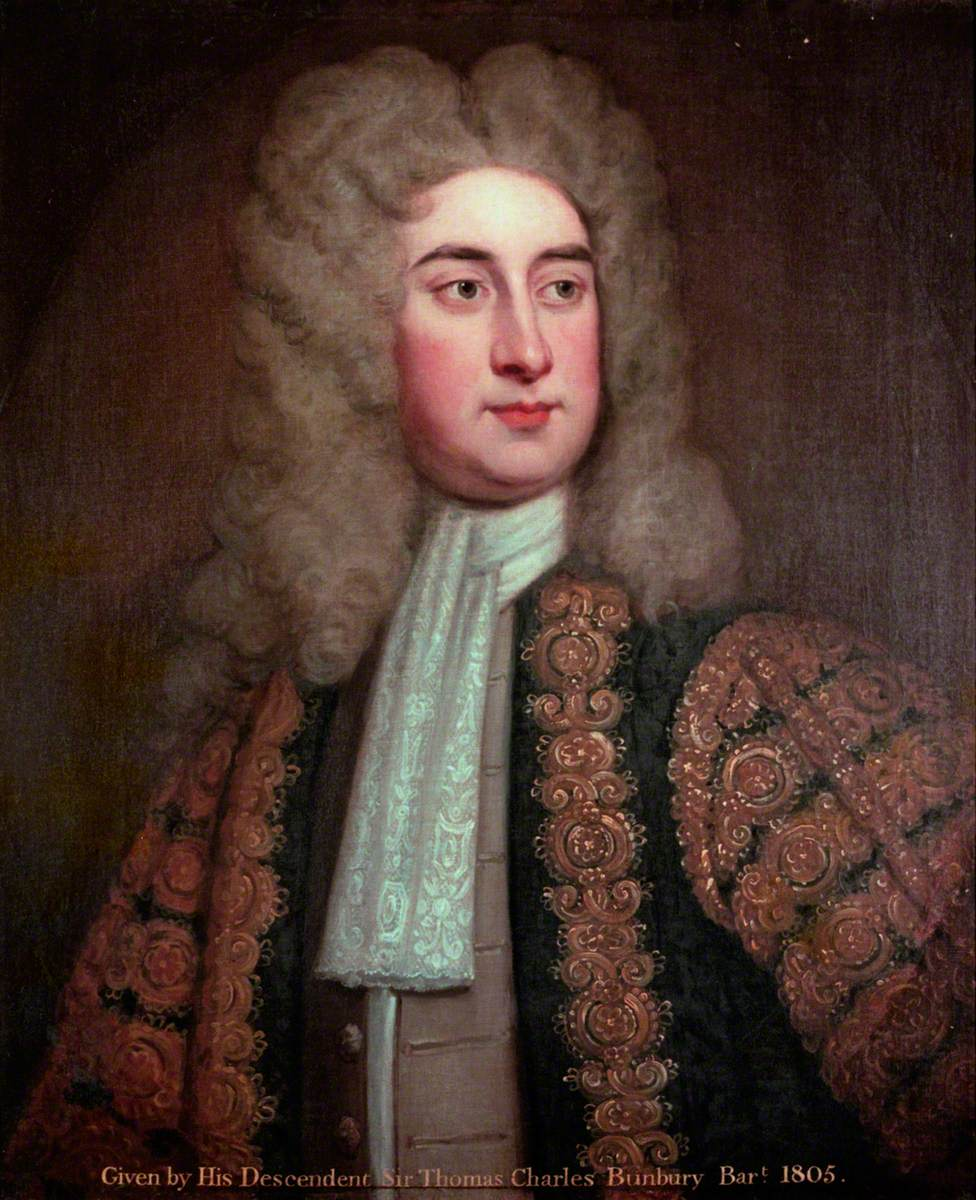
- Sir Thomas Hanmer, Bt, Speaker of the House of Commons

Overview
- Term: 12 November 1713 – 15 January 1715

House of Commons
- Members: 558 MPs
- Speaker of the House of Commons: Sir Thomas Hanmer

House of Lords
- Lord Keeper of the Great Seal: Simon Harcourt

Sessions
- 1st: 16 February 1714 – 9 July 1714
- 2nd: 1 August 1714 – 25 August 1714

The 4th Parliament of Great Britain was summoned by Queen Anne on 18 August 1713 and assembled on the 12 November 1713 (but was then prorogued until 16 February 1714). It was dissolved on 15 January 1715 and would be Queen Anne's last Parliament.

The composition of the new House of Commons was the result of an even greater Tory landslide than at the previous election, with 369 pro-government Tories, 162 Whigs plus 13 Whig supporters and 14 others. Sir Thomas Hanmer, Bt, member for Suffolk, was installed as Speaker of the House of Commons.

Robert Harley, 1st Earl of Oxford and Earl Mortimer, Lord High Treasurer and Tory leader of the Queen's ministry had major problems in coping with the Tory faction, split as it was between Jacobite supporters and "Hanoverians". He also had to contend with the leadership ambitions of Henry St John, 1st Viscount Bolingbroke. Eventually a number of factors (such as his heavy drinking and seeking a dukedom for his son) lead to his downfall and on 30 July 1714 he was stripped of his office in favour, not of Bolingbroke, but Charles Talbot, 1st Duke of Shrewsbury, a "Hanoverian". Queen Anne, who was quite ill at this time, died the following day.

After her death a Commission of Regency dominated by Hanoverian supporters, supervised the transition of the monarchy to George, Elector of Hanover, who in October 1714 would be crowned George I of Great Britain. Parliament reconvened for a second short session to complete formalities but was not dissolved until January 1715 as a precaution in the event of a Jacobite rebellion.

== See also ==
- List of MPs elected in the 1713 British general election
- 1713 British general election
- Oxford-Bolingbroke ministry
- List of acts of the 1st session of the 4th Parliament of Great Britain
- List of acts of the 2nd session of the 4th Parliament of Great Britain
- List of parliaments of Great Britain

== Sources ==
Preceded by 3rd Parliament of Great Britain	4th Parliament of Great Britain; 1713–1715	Succeeded by 5th Parliament of Great Britain
