= Handsel Monday =

Scotland traditional celebration

- Also called: Auld Hansel Monday
- Observed by: Scotland
- Date: First Monday in January
- 2025 date: January 6
- 2026 date: January 5
- 2027 date: January 4
- 2028 date: January 3
- Frequency: annual

In Scotland, Handsel Monday or Hansel Monday is the first Monday of the year. Traditionally, gifts (Scots: Hansels) were given at this time.

Among the rural population of Scotland, Auld Hansel Monday, is traditionally celebrated on the first Monday after January 12. This custom reflects a reluctance to switch from the old (Julian) style calendar to the new (Gregorian) calendar.

== History ==
The word "handsel" originates from old Saxon word which means “to deliver into the hand”. It refers to small tips and gifts of money given as a token of good luck, particularly at the beginning of something; the modern house-warming gift would be a good example. An 1825 glossary marks Handsel Monday as an occasion "when it is customary to make children and servants a present". On this day, tips of small gifts were expected by servants, as well as by the postman, the deliverers of newspapers, scavengers, and all persons who wait upon the house.

In this respect it is somewhat similar to Boxing Day, which eventually supplanted it. If the handsel was a physical object rather than money, tradition said that the object could not be sharp, or it would "cut" the relationship between the giver and the recipient. The day is known in Scottish Gaelic as Diluain Traoighte (drained Monday).

The custom was also known as “handseling a purse”. A new purse would not be given to anyone without placing money in it for good luck. Money received during Handsel Monday is supposed to ensure monetary luck for the rest of the year.

The period of festivities running from Christmas to Handsel Monday, including Hogmanay and Ne'erday, is known as the Daft Days.
