= Pleading Act 1711 =

Act of the Parliament of Great Britain

Pleading Act 1711 (Note: The citation of this act by this short title was authorised by section 1 of, and the first schedule to, the Short Titles Act 1896. Due to the repeal of those provisions it is now authorised by section 19(2) of the Interpretation Act 1978.)
- Act of Parliament
- Parliament of Great Britain
- Long title: An Act [to give further time for inrolling such leases granted from the crown, as have not be inrolled within the respective times therein limited; and] for making the pleading of Deeds of Bargain and Sale enrolled and of Fee Farm Rents more easie. (Note: These words are printed against this act in the second column of the first schedule to the Short Titles Act 1896, which is headed "Title".)
- Citation: 10 Ann. c. 28 (Note: This is the citation in The Statutes of the Realm.); 10 Ann. c. 18 (Note: This is the citation in The Statutes at Large.)
- Territorial extent: Great Britain

Dates
- Royal assent: 22 May 1712
- Commencement: 7 December 1711 (Note: Start of session.)
- Repealed: 1 January 1926
Other legislation
Amended by	Statute Law Revision Act 1867; Statute Law Revision Act 1887
Repealed by	Law of Property (Amendment) Act 1924

Status: Repealed

Text of statute as originally enacted

The Pleading Act 1711 (10 Ann. c. 28) was an act of the Parliament of Great Britain.

The act is chapter 18 in Ruffhead's Edition and chapter XVIII in the common printed editions.

== Subsequent developments ==
Sections 1 and 2 of the act were repealed by section 1 of, and the schedule to, the Statute Law Revision Act 1867 (30 & 31 Vict. c. 59), which came into force on 15 July 1867.

The title from "to give" to "limited and" was repealed by section 1 of, and the schedule to, the Statute Law Revision Act 1887 (50 & 51 Vict. c. 59).

The whole act, being an enactment which, as respects England and Wales, was rendered obsolete by the Law of Property Act 1922 (12 & 13 Geo. 5. c. 16), was repealed for England and Wales on 1 January 1926.
