= Scottish Episcopalians Act 1711 =

Act of the Parliament of Great Britain

Scottish Episcopalians Act 1711 (Note: The citation of this act by this short title was authorised by section 1 of, and schedule 1 to, the Short Titles Act 1896. Due to the repeal of those provisions, it is now authorised by section 19(2) of the Interpretation Act 1978.)
- Act of Parliament
- Parliament of Great Britain
- Long title: An Act to prevent the disturbing those of the Episcopal Communion in Scotland in the Exercise of their Religious Worship and in the Use of the Liturgy of the Church of England and for repealing the Act passed in the Parliament of Scotland intituled Act against irregular Baptisms and Marriages
- Citation: 10 Ann. c. 10 (Note: This is the citation in The Statutes of the Realm.); 10 Ann. c. 7 (Note: This is the citation in The Statutes at Large.)
- Territorial extent: England and Wales; Scotland

Dates
- Royal assent: 3 March 1712
- Commencement: 7 December 1711 (Note: Start of session.)
Other legislation
Amended by	Statute Law Revision Act 1867; Promissory Oaths Act 1871; Statute Law Revision Act 1888; Marriage (Scotland) Act 1977; Statute Law (Repeals) Act 1977

Status: Amended

Text of statute as originally enacted

Revised text of statute as amended

Text of the Scottish Episcopalians Act 1711 as in force today (including any amendments) within the United Kingdom, from legislation.gov.uk.

The Scottish Episcopalians Act 1711 (10 Ann. c. 10), also referred to as the Toleration Act 1712, is an act of the Parliament of Great Britain. Its purpose was "to prevent the disturbing those of the Episcopal Communion in Scotland in the Exercise of their Religious Worship and in the Use of the Liturgy of the Church of England and for repealing the Act passed in the Parliament of Scotland intituled Act against irregular Baptisms and Marriages".

As of 2025, the act was partly in force in Great Britain.

== History ==
In 1690, the national Church of Scotland abolished the Bishops in the Church of Scotland due to their refusal to swear loyalty to King William II of Scotland and following the Glorious Revolution. The now-deposed bishops continued to minister and it led to the creation of the Scottish Episcopal Church. In the early 1700s, Scottish episcopal worship increased, usually relying on ordained priests from the Church of England. In 1709, Reverend James Greenshields was conducting a service in accordance with Church of England liturgy when he was arrested at the behest of the Church of Scotland's Presbytery of Edinburgh for "being within their bounds and without their allowance and introducing a form of worship contrary to the purity and uniformity of the church established by law". He was found guilty at Edinburgh Magistrates' court and lost an appeal to the Court of Session. He spent seven months in prison before being freed after a successful appeal to the House of Lords who ruled that he was acting legally.

Due to the ambiguity of their status under Scots law, the act was passed by the Parliament of Great Britain. The act affirmed that the Scottish Episcopal Church and any other worship carried out under Anglican liturgy were legal in Scotland. It also granted protection from criminal or civil actions brought by the Church of Scotland and prohibited any civil or criminal action being taken against any person who partook in episcopal worship, even if they had been excommunicated from the Church of Scotland. The act did however require Scottish Episcopalians to pray for the monarch during services.

== Subsequent developments ==
Section 3 as to form of oath of abjuration, namely from " I A, B, do truly " to end of the section, was repealed by section 1 of, and the schedule to, the Statute Law Revision Act 1867 (30 & 31 Vict. c. 59), which came into force on 15 July 1867.

Section 3 of the act was repealed by section 1 of, and part II of schedule one to, the Promissory Oaths Act 1871 (34 & 35 Vict. c. 48), which came into force on 13 July 1871.

Section 7 of the act was repealed by section 28(2) of, and schedule 3 to, the Marriage (Scotland) Act 1977, which came into force on 1 January 1978.

Sections 4 and 13 of the act were repealed by section 1(1) of, and part V of schedule 1 to, the Statute Law (Repeals) Act 1977, which came into force on 16 June 1977.
