= Princess Sophia's Precedence Act 1711 =

Act of the Parliament of Great Britain

Princess Sophia's Precedence Act 1711 (Note: The citation of this act by this short title was authorised by section 1 of, and the first schedule to, the Short Titles Act 1896. Due to the repeal of those provisions it is now authorised by section 19(2) of the Interpretation Act 1978.)
- Act of Parliament
- Parliament of Great Britain
- Long title: An Act for settling the Precedence of the most Excellent Princess Sophia Electress and Dutchess Dowager of Hanover of the Elector Her Son and of the Electoral Prince the Duke of Cambridge.
- Citation: 10 Ann. c. 8 (Note: This is the citation in The Statutes of the Realm.); 10 Ann. c. 4 (Note: This is the citation in The Statutes at Large.)
- Territorial extent: Great Britain

Dates
- Royal assent: 9 February 1712
- Commencement: 7 December 1711 (Note: Start of session.)

Other legislation
- Relates to: Act of Settlement 1701

Status: Current legislation

Text of statute as originally enacted

Revised text of statute as amended

Text of the Princess Sophia's Precedence Act 1711 as in force today (including any amendments) within the United Kingdom, from legislation.gov.uk.

The Princess Sophia's Precedence Act 1711 (10 Ann. c. 8) is an act of the Parliament of Great Britain.

It reiterated the Act of Settlement 1701 (12 & 13 Will. 3. c. 2) that the line of succession to the British throne, in the absence of any children of Queen Anne, passed directly to Electress Sophia of Hanover and "the heirs of her body being Protestants". As such, Sophia was heir presumptive, followed by her children.

This being so, it provided that the formal order of precedence be modified to reflect this; Sophia was given precedence after Queen Anne, followed by her son George; any other Protestant heirs of Sophia were to take precedence before the Archbishop of Canterbury, the great officers of state, and the nobility, effectively ranking them with the royal family.

As of 2025, the act was wholly in force in Great Britain.
