= List of acts of the Parliament of Great Britain from 1710 =

This is a complete list of acts of the Parliament of Great Britain for the year 1710.

For acts passed until 1707, see the list of acts of the Parliament of England and the list of acts of the Parliament of Scotland. See also the list of acts of the Parliament of Ireland.

For acts passed from 1801 onwards, see the list of acts of the Parliament of the United Kingdom. For acts of the devolved parliaments and assemblies in the United Kingdom, see the list of acts of the Scottish Parliament, the list of acts of the Northern Ireland Assembly, and the list of acts and measures of Senedd Cymru; see also the list of acts of the Parliament of Northern Ireland.

The number shown after each act's title is its chapter number. Acts are cited using this number, preceded by the year(s) of the reign during which the relevant parliamentary session was held; thus the Union with Ireland Act 1800 is cited as "39 & 40 Geo. 3. c. 67", meaning the 67th act passed during the session that started in the 39th year of the reign of George III and which finished in the 40th year of that reign. Note that the modern convention is to use Arabic numerals in citations (thus "41 Geo. 3" rather than "41 Geo. III"). Acts of the last session of the Parliament of Great Britain and the first session of the Parliament of the United Kingdom are both cited as "41 Geo. 3".

Acts passed by the Parliament of Great Britain did not have a short title; however, some of these acts have subsequently been given a short title by acts of the Parliament of the United Kingdom (such as the Short Titles Act 1896).

Before the Acts of Parliament (Commencement) Act 1793 came into force on 8 April 1793, acts passed by the Parliament of Great Britain were deemed to have come into effect on the first day of the session in which they were passed. Because of this, the years given in the list below may in fact be the year before a particular act was passed.

== 9 Ann. ==
The first session of the 3rd Parliament of Great Britain, which met from 25 November 1710 until 12 June 1711.

This session was also traditionally cited as 9 Anne or 9 A.

=== Public acts ===
Short title	Citation	Royal assent
Long title
Land Tax Act 1710 (repealed)	9 Ann. c. 1	23 December 1710
An Act for granting an Aid to Her Majesty, to be raised by a Land Tax in Great Britain, for the Service of the Year One Thousand Seven Hundred and Eleven. (Repealed by Statute Law Revision Act 1867 (30 & 31 Vict. c. 59))
Quarantine Act 1710 (repealed)	9 Ann. c. 2	23 December 1710
An Act to oblige Ships, coming from Places infected, more effectually to perform their Quarentine. (Repealed by Statute Law Revision Act 1867 (30 & 31 Vict. c. 59))
Taxation Act 1710 (repealed)	9 Ann. c. 3	31 January 1711
An Act for charging and continuing the Duties upon Malt, Mum, Cyder, and Perry, for the Service of the Year One Thousand Seven Hundred and Eleven. (Repealed by Statute Law Revision Act 1867 (30 & 31 Vict. c. 59))
Recruiting Act 1710 (repealed)	9 Ann. c. 4	28 February 1711
An Act to continue the Acts for recruiting Her Majesty's Land Forces and Marines, for the Service of the Year One Thousand Seven Hundred and Eleven. (Repealed by Statute Law Revision Act 1867 (30 & 31 Vict. c. 59))
Parliament Act 1710 (repealed)	9 Ann. c. 5	28 February 1711
An Act for securing the Freedom of Parliaments, by the father qualifying the Members to fit in the House of Commons. (Repealed by Property Qualification for Members of Parliament Act 1858 (21 & 22 Vict. c. 26))
Lotteries Act 1710 (repealed)	9 Ann. c. 6	6 March 1711
An Act for reviving continuing and appropriating certain Duties upon several Commodities to be exported and certain Duties upon Coals to be waterborn and carried Coastwise and for granting further Duties upon Candles for Thirty two Years to raise Fifteen hundred thousand Pounds by way of a Lottery for the Service of the Year One thousand seven hundred and eleven and for suppressing such unlawful Lotteries and such Insurance Offices as are therein mentioned. (Repealed for England and Wales and Scotland by Betting and Lotteries Act 1934 (24 & 25 Geo. 5. c. 58) and for Northern Ireland by Betting and Lotteries Act (Northern Ireland) 1957 (c. 19 (N.I.)))
Bank of England Act 1710 (repealed)	9 Ann. c. 7	17 March 1711
An Act for enabling and obliging the Bank of England, for the Time therein mentioned, to exchange all Exchequer Bills for ready Money, upon Demand; and to disable any Person to be Governor, Deputy-governor, or Director, of the Bank of England, and a Director of the East-India Company, at the same Time. (Repealed by Statute Law Revision Act 1867 (30 & 31 Vict. c. 59))
Trade with France Act 1710 (repealed)	9 Ann. c. 8	17 March 1711
An Act to repeal the Act of the Third and Fourth Year of Her Majesty's Reign, intituled, "An Act for prohibiting all Trade and Commerce with France," (Note: Trade with France Act 1704 (3 & 4 Ann. c. 12)) so far as it relates to the prohibiting the Importation of French Wines. (Repealed by Statute Law Revision Act 1867 (30 & 31 Vict. c. 59))
Mutiny Act 1710 (repealed)	9 Ann. c. 9	26 March 1711
An Act to continue the Acts for punishing Mutiny and Desertion, and false Musters, and for the better Payment of the Army and Quarters; and for approving of Medicines for the Army. (Repealed by Statute Law Revision Act 1867 (30 & 31 Vict. c. 59))
Devon Public Stock Act 1710	9 Ann. c. 10 (Note: This is the citation in The Statutes of the Realm.); 9 Ann. c. 4 Pr. (Note: This is the citation in The Statutes at Large.)	17 March 1711
An Act for ratifying several Purchases lately made with the Public Stock of the County of Devon; and for making further Purchases, for the Use of the said County, with the Public Stock thereof; and also for regulating and better Employment of the Public Stock of the said County.
Post Office (Revenues) Act 1710 (repealed)	9 Ann. c. 11; 9 Ann. c. 10	16 May 1711
An Act for establishing a General Post Office for all Her Majesties Dominions, and for settling a weekly Sum out of the Revenues thereof for the Service of the War and other Her Majesties Occasions. (Repealed by Statute Law Revision Act 1871 (34 & 35 Vict. c. 116), Revenue Officers' Disabilities Removal Act 1874 (37 & 38 Vict. c. 22) and Post Office Act 1908 (8 Edw. 7. c. 48))
Taxation (No. 2) Act 1710 (repealed)	9 Ann. c. 12; 9 Ann. c. 11	16 May 1711
An Act for laying certain Duties upon Hides and Skins, tanned, tawed, or dressed, and upon Vellum and Parchment, for the Term of Thirty-two Years, for prosecuting the War, and other Her Majesty's Occasions. (Repealed by Statute Law Revision Act 1867 (30 & 31 Vict. c. 59))
Taxation (No. 3) Act 1710 (repealed)	9 Ann. c. 13; 9 Ann. c. 12	16 May 1711
An Act for laying a Duty upon Hops. (Repealed by Statute Law Revision Act 1867 (30 & 31 Vict. c. 59))
Royston and Wandesford Bridge Road Act 1710 (repealed)	9 Ann. c. 14; 9 Ann. c. 7 Pr.	16 May 1711
An Act for repairing and amending the Highways leading from Royston, in the County of Hertford, to Wandesford Bridge, in the County of Huntington. (Repealed by Road from Royston to Wandesford Bridge Act 1815 (55 Geo. 3. c. xxxv) and Royston and Wandesford Bridge Road Act 1822 (3 Geo. 4. c. lxviii))
Stamps Act 1710 (repealed)	9 Ann. c. 15; 9 Ann. c. 21	12 June 1711
An Act for making good Deficiencies, and satisfying the Public Debts; and for erecting a Corporation to carry on a Trade to The South Seas; and for the Encouragement of the Fishery; and for Liberty to trade in unwrought Iron with the Subjects of Spain; and to repeal the Acts for registering Seamen. (Repealed by Inland Revenue Repeal Act 1870 (33 & 34 Vict. c. 99))
Stamps (No. 2) Act 1710 (repealed)	9 Ann. c. 16; 9 Ann. c. 23	12 June 1711
An Act for licensing and regulating Hackney Coaches and Chairs; and for charging certain new Duties on Stamped Vellum, Parchment, and Paper, and on Cards and Dice, and on the Exportation of Rock Salt for Ireland; and for securing thereby, and by a Weekly Payment out of the Post-office, and by several Duties on Hides and Skins, a Yearly Fund of One Hundred Eighty-six Thousand Six Hundred and Seventy Pounds, for Thirty-two Years, to be applied to the Satisfaction of such Orders as are therein mentioned, to the Contributors of any Sum, not exceeding Two Millions, to be raised for carrying on the War, and other Her Majesty's Occasions. (Repealed by Inland Revenue Repeal Act 1870 (33 & 34 Vict. c. 99))
New Churches in London and Westminster Act 1710 (repealed)	9 Ann. c. 17	12 June 1711
An Act for granting to Her Majesty several Duties upon Coals, for building Fifty new Churches in and about the Cities of London and Westminster, and Suburbs thereof, and other Purposes therein mentioned. (Repealed by Statute Law (Repeals) Act 2013 (c. 2))
Public Accounts Act 1710 (repealed)	9 Ann. c. 18; 9 Ann. c. 13	16 May 1711
An Act for the taking, examining, and stating, the Public Accompts of the Kingdom. (Repealed by Statute Law Revision Act 1867 (30 & 31 Vict. c. 59))
Gaming Act 1710 (repealed)	9 Ann. c. 19; 9 Ann. c. 14	16 May 1711
An Act for better preventing of excessive and deceitful Gaming. (Repealed by Gambling Act 2005 (c. 19))
Assise of Fuel Act 1710 (repealed)	9 Ann. c. 20; 9 Ann. c. 15	16 May 1711
An Act for making more effectual an Act of the Forty-third Year of the Reign of Queen Elizabeth, intituled, "An Act concerning the Assize of Fuel," (Note: Assise of Fuel Act 1601 (43 Eliz. 1. c. 14)) so far as it relates to the Assize of Billet. (Repealed by Statute Law Revision Act 1867 (30 & 31 Vict. c. 59))
Assaulting a Privy Counsellor Act 1710 (repealed)	9 Ann. c. 21; 9 Ann. c. 16	16 May 1711
An Act to make an Attempt on the Life of a Privy Counsellor, in the Execution of his Office, to be Felony without Benefit of Clergy. (Repealed by Offences Against the Person Act 1828 (9 Geo. 4. c. 31) and for India by Criminal Law (India) Act 1828 (9 Geo. 4. c. 74))
Preservation of Trees, America Act 1710 (repealed)	9 Ann. c. 22; 9 Ann. c. 17	16 May 1711
An Act for the Preservation of White and other Pine Trees, growing in Her Majesty's Colonies of New Hampshire, The Massachusets Bay, and Province of Main, Rhode Island, and Providence Plantation, The Narraganset Country, or King's Province, and Connecticut, in New England; and New York, and New Jersey, in America, for the masting Her Majesty's Navy. (Repealed by Statute Law Revision Act 1867 (30 & 31 Vict. c. 59))
Highways Act 1710 (repealed)	9 Ann. c. 23; 9 Ann. c. 18	16 May 1711
An Act to render more effectual an Act made in the Sixth Year of Her present Majesty, (Note: Highways Act 1707 (6 Ann. c. 56)) intituled, "An Act to repeal a Clause in an Act of the Seventh Year of the Reign of His late Majesty, (Note: Highways Act 1695 (7 & 8 Will. 3. c. 29)) for amending Highways, which enjoins Waggoners and others to draw with a Pole between the Wheel Horses, or with Double Shafts; and to oblige them to draw only with Six Horses, or other Beasts, except up Hills. (Repealed by Highways (No. 2) Act 1766 (7 Geo. 3. c. 42))
Lease of Exeter Castle Act 1710 (repealed)	9 Ann. c. 24; 9 Ann. c. 19	16 May 1711
An Act to enable Her Majesty to grant the Scite of the Castle of Exon (Parcel of Her Dutchy of Cornwall) for Ninety-nine Years, for the Use and Benefit of the County of Devon. (Repealed by Statute Law Revision Act 1948 (11 & 12 Geo. 6. c. 62))
Municipal Offices Act 1710 (repealed)	9 Ann. c. 25; 9 Ann. c. 20	16 May 1711
An Act for rendering the Proceedings upon Writs of Mandamus and Informations in the Nature of a Quo warranto more speedy and effectual, and for the more easy trying and determining the Rights of Offices and Franchises in Corporations and Boroughs. (Repealed by Parliamentary Elections Act 1840 (3 & 4 Vict. c. 47), Statute Law Revision and Civil Procedure Act 1881 (44 & 45 Vict. c. 59), Statute Law Revision and Civil Procedure Act 1883 (46 & 47 Vict. c. 49), Local Government Act 1933 (c. 51) and London Government Act 1939 (2 & 3 Geo. 6. c. 40))
Mine Adventurers of England Act 1710 (repealed)	9 Ann. c. 26; 9 Ann. c. 24	12 June 1711
An Act for Relief of the Creditors and Proprietors of the Company of Mine Adventurers, by establishing a Method for settling the Differences between the Company and their Creditors; and for uniting them, in order to an effectual working the Mines of the said Company. (Repealed by Statute Law Revision Act 1948 (11 & 12 Geo. 6. c. 62))
Game Act 1710 (repealed)	9 Ann. c. 27; 9 Ann. c. 25	12 June 1711
An Act for making the Act of the Fifth Year of Her Majesty's Reign, for the Preservation of the Game, perpetual; and for making the same more effectual. (Repealed by Game Act 1831 (1 & 2 Will. 4. c. 32))
Thames Fishery Act 1710 (repealed)	9 Ann. c. 28; 9 Ann. c. 26	12 June 1711
An Act for the better Preservation and Improvement of the Fishery within the River of Thames; and for regulating and governing the Company of Fishermen of the said River. (Repealed by Sea Fisheries Act 1868 (31 & 32 Vict. c. 45))
Trade to America Act 1710 (repealed)	9 Ann. c. 29; 9 Ann. c. 27	12 June 1711
An Act for the Encouragement of the Trade to America. (Repealed by South Sea Company Act 1815 (55 Geo. 3. c. 57) (Note: The Chronological Table of the Statutes prints this citation as "1815 c. 47"; the South Sea Company repealer is listed as 55 Geo. 3. c. 57.) and Naval Prize Acts Repeal Act 1864 (27 & 28 Vict. c. 23))
Coal Trade Act 1710 (repealed)	9 Ann. c. 30; 9 Ann. c. 28	12 June 1711
An Act to dissolve the present, and prevent the future, Combination of Coal Owners, Lightermen, Masters of Ships, and others, to advance the Price of Coals, in Prejudice of the Navigation, Trade, and Manufactures, of this Kingdom; and for the further Encouragement of the Coal Trade. (Repealed by Statute Law Revision Act 1867 (30 & 31 Vict. c. 59))
Militia Act 1710 (repealed)	9 Ann. c. 31; 9 Ann. c. 29	12 June 1711
An Act for raising the Militia for the Year One Thousand Seven Hundred and Eleven, although the Month's Pay formerly advanced be not re-paid. (Repealed by Statute Law Revision Act 1867 (30 & 31 Vict. c. 59))
Woollen, etc., Manufacturers Act 1710 (repealed)	9 Ann. c. 32; 9 Ann. c. 30	12 June 1711
An Act for reviving and continuing an Act made in the First Year of Her Majesty's Reign, (Note: Woollen Manufactures Act 1702 (1 Ann. St. 2. c. 22)) for the more effectual preventing Abuses and Frauds of Persons employed in the working up the Woollen, Linen, Fustian, Cotton, and Iron Manufactures of this Kingdom. (Repealed by Statute Law Revision Act 1867 (30 & 31 Vict. c. 59))
Petersfield Highways Act 1710 (repealed)	9 Ann. c. 33; 9 Ann. c. 8 Pr.	16 May 1711
An Act for repairing the Highways from Sheet Bridge, in the Parish of Petersfield, to the Town of Portsmouth, in the County of Southampton. (Repealed by Southampton Roads Act 1772 (12 Geo. 3. c. 108))
Dunstable Highways Act 1710	9 Ann. c. 34; 9 Ann. c. 9 Pr.	16 May 1711
An Act for repairing the Highways between Dunstable and Hockley, in the County of Bedford.

=== Private acts ===
Short title	Citation	Royal assent
Long title
Monoux's Estate Act 1710	9 Ann. c. 1 Pr.	28 February 1711
An Act for the Sale of Lands and Tenements late of Sir Philip Monoux Baronet, deceased, in Broome and Parish of Southill, in the County of Bedford, according to his Will.
Correction of and extension of time in an Act concerning William Malet's debt.	9 Ann. c. 2 Pr.	28 February 1711
An Act for rectifying the Mistake, and enlarging the Time for a Composition given by an Act of Parliament, passed in the Seventh Year of Her Majesty's Reign, intituled, An Act to enable the Lord High Treasurer, or Commissioners of the Treasury, for the Time being, to compound with William Malet Esquire, for the Debt of his Father, for whom he was Surety while Receiver General of the County of Somerset and City of Bristol. (Note: 7 Ann. c. 19 Pr.)
Isaack's Estate Act 1710	9 Ann. c. 3 Pr.	6 March 1711
An Act for the Sale of the Barton and Farm of Pollesloe, in the County of Devon, late the Estate of Sebastian Isaack Esquire, deceased, for discharging Incumbrances thereupon; and for Distribution of the Surplus Money.
Earl of Plymouth's Estate Act 1710	9 Ann. c. 4 Pr.	17 March 1711
An Act to vest the Manor, or reputed Manor, of Wadborough, alias Wadberrow, in the County of Worcester, and other Lands there, which came to the Right Honourable Other Earl of Plimouth by his Mother, in Trustees, to be sold, for raising more Money, to pay off Debts charged upon his Paternal Estate; and for other Purposes.
Earl of Berkshire's Estate Act 1710	9 Ann. c. 5 Pr.	26 March 1711
An Act for Sale of the Manor of Reaversby, and other Lands, in the County of Lincoln, the Estate of Henry Bowes Earl of Berkshire; and to settle other Lands, in the County of Stafford, to the same Uses.
Settlement of the estates of Evelyn Marquis of Dorchester, William Pierrepont (Lord Kingston) his son and heir, and settling the estate of John Hall on William's marriage.	9 Ann. c. 6 Pr.	16 May 1711
An Act for settling the Estates of the Right Noble Evelyn Lord Marquis of Dorchester, and William Pierrepont Esquire, commonly called Lord Kingston, Son and Heir Apparent of the said Lord Marquis; and also for settling the Estate late of John Hall Esquire, on the Marriage of the said William Pierrepont Esquire.
Enabling Arthur Earl of Anglesey and Henry Viscount Hide to take in England the oath of office as Vice Treasurer and Receiver General and Paymaster General of Her Majesty's Revenues in Ireland.	9 Ann. c. 7 Pr.	16 May 1711
An Act to enable Arthur Earl of Anglesey and Henry Hyde Esquire, commonly called Henry Viscount Hyde, to take in England the Oath of Office, as Vice Treasurer and Receiver General, and Paymaster General, of Her Majesty's Revenues in Her Kingdom of Ireland; and to qualify themselves in England for the legal Enjoyment of the said Office.
Earl of Thomond's Estate Act 1710	9 Ann. c. 8 Pr.	16 May 1711
An Act to enable the Earl of Thomond to make Leases for Three Lives, with Covenants for Renewal thereof for ever; and Grants in Fee-farm of the Lands and Hereditaments in Ireland, comprized in his Marriage Settlement.
Viscount Mountague's Estate Act 1710	9 Ann. c. 9 Pr.	16 May 1711
An Act for vesting in Henry Arundell Esquire and his Heirs the Trust in the Estate of the Lord Viscount Mountagu, which is vested in Her Majesty by the Attainder of John Caryll Esquire for High Treason.
Discharge of John Bishop of Rapho's (Ireland) penalty and disabilities incurred from omission to take Oath of Abjuration before 1 August 1703, and validating all ecclesiastical and civil acts done by him after that omission.	9 Ann. c. 10 Pr.	16 May 1711
An Act for discharging John Lord Bishop of Rapho, in the Kingdom of Ireland, from all Penalties, Disabilities, and Incapacities, incurred by him, in omitting to take the Oath of Abjuration on or before the First Day of August One Thousand Seven Hundred and Three; and for making all Ecclesiastical and Civil Acts done by him as Bishop of Rapho, after such Omission, to be of the same Validity as they would have been if he had taken the said Oath in due Time.
Establishment of purchase of lands in Ireland by Sir Alexander Cairnes from James Duke of Ormond in pursuance of a power given him by an Act of 1700.	9 Ann. c. 11 Pr.	16 May 1711
An Act for the establishing a Purchase of certain Fee-farms, Lands, and Hereditaments, in the Kingdom of Ireland, made by Sir Alexander Cairnes Baronet, of his Grace James Duke of Ormond, in Pursuance of a Power given him by an Act of Parliament passed in this Kingdom in the Twelfth Year of His late Majesty's Reign, (Note: 12 & 13 Will. 3. c. 1 Pr.) notwithstanding an Act passed in Ireland in the Ninth Year of the Reign of Her present Majesty, or a Deed dated the Five and Twentieth of April One Thousand Seven Hundred and Ten, therein mentioned.
Brasenose College, Oxford Estate Act 1710	9 Ann. c. 12 Pr.	16 May 1711
An Act for confirming to the Principal and Scholars of King's Hall and College of Brasen-nose, in the University of Oxford, the Purchase of the Advowsons of Stepney, and other Churches; and for settling the same to the Benefit of the said College.
Palmer's Estate Act 1710	9 Ann. c. 13 Pr.	16 May 1711
An Act for confirming a Lease for One and Twenty Years, made by Jeffery Palmer Esquire and others, of Lands in Carlton Curliew, in the County of Leicester, for Payment of the Debts of the said Jeffery Palmer.
Mathew's Estate Act 1710	9 Ann. c. 14 Pr.	16 May 1711
An Act for Sale of such Part of the Estate of Nathaniel Mathew, late of Petersham, in the County of Surrey, Gentleman, deceased, as will be sufficient to discharge his Debts and Legacies thereon charged by his last Will and Testament; and for settling the Remainder thereof to the Uses in the said Will mentioned.
Henden's Estate Act 1710	9 Ann. c. 15 Pr.	16 May 1711
An Act for Sale of several Lands and Hereditaments of William Henden Esquire, in the County of Kent, for Payment of his Debts; and for settling other Lands in the same County, of a better Value, to the same Uses, in Lieu thereof.
Pooler's Estate Act 1710	9 Ann. c. 16 Pr.	16 May 1711
An Act for Sale of the Estate of Humphry Pooler, in the Parish of Hartlebury, in the County of Worcester.
Allin's Estate Act 1710	9 Ann. c. 17 Pr.	16 May 1711
An Act for the Sale of Part of the Estate of Sir Richard Allin, alias Anguish, Baronet, in the Counties of Suffolk and Norfolk, for Payment of his Debts; and settling the Remainder according to his Marriage Articles.
Grosvenor's Estate Act 1710	9 Ann. c. 18 Pr.	16 May 1711
An Act to enable Trustees to perform the Marriage Articles of Sir Richard Grosvenor Baronet and Dame Jane his Wife, notwithstanding the Lunacy of Dame Mary Grosvenor, and the Infancy of her Younger Children; and for settling the Estate in the Family, and making Building Leases, as effectually as if the said Dame Mary was of sound Mind, and her Children of full Age, and all had joined in levying Fines.
Poynter's Estate Act 1710	9 Ann. c. 19 Pr.	16 May 1711
An Act for vesting several Messuages or Tenements, in Bride Lane, and elsewhere, in the Parish of St. Bridget, alias St. Brides, London, of John Poynter Esquire, in Trustees, to be sold, in Lieu and Satisfaction of other Manors, Lands, and Tenements, of a greater Value, settled by the said John Poynter to such Uses, and upon such Trusts, as the said Houses in London are settled.
Hardre's Estate Act 1710	9 Ann. c. 20 Pr.	16 May 1711
An Act to enable John Hardres Esquire and Anne his Wife to sell certain Lands in the County of Kent; and for settling of others to the Uses therein mentioned.
Bridger's Estate Act 1710	9 Ann. c. 21 Pr.	16 May 1711
An Act for vesting of certain Lands, in the Parish of Woodchurch, in the County of Kent, formerly purchased by Winifred Bridger and Lawrence Bridger, in certain Trustees, to be sold, for the raising Money, for the Purposes therein-mentioned.
Wood's Estate Act 1710	9 Ann. c. 22 Pr.	16 May 1711
An Act for the Sale of the Manor of Great Bealings, and several Farms, Lands, and Hereditaments, late the Estate of Henry Wood, alias Webb, Esquire, deceased, in Great Bealings, and several other Places in the County of Suffolk, for discharging a Mortgage thereon, and for Payment of other Debts of the said Henry Wood, alias Webb; and for applying the Overplus-money (if any) arising by such Sale, for the Benefit of Henry Wood, alias Webb (an Infant), his Son and Heir.
Stonebridge Field, Piccadilly Act 1710	9 Ann. c. 23 Pr.	16 May 1711
An Act for vesting a certain Piece of Ground, being Part of a Field called Stonebridge Field, adjoining to Piccadilly, in the County of Midd'x, in Trustees, to dispose of the same, to discharge a Debt to the Crown, and to other Uses.
Robinson's Estate Act 1710	9 Ann. c. 24 Pr.	16 May 1711
An Act to vest the Estate of Sir Henry Robinson Knight, a Lunatic, lying in Cransley, in the County of Northampton, in Trustees, to enable them to make a Settlement on the Marriage of John Robinson Esquire, only Son and Heir Apparent of the said Sir Henry; and for other Purposes therein mentioned.
Burgoyne's Estate Act 1710	9 Ann. c. 25 Pr.	16 May 1711
An Act to enable Trustees to make, renew, and fill up, Leases of the Estate of William Burgoyne, late of the City of Exon, Merchant, deceased, during the Minority of his Son and Daughters.
Jermyn's Divorce Act 1710	9 Ann. c. 26 Pr.	16 May 1711
An Act for dissolving the Marriage of Stephen Jermyn, the only Son of Stephen Jermyn, of London, Merchant, with Sarah Bell; and to enable him to marry again.
Weston's Estate Act 1710	9 Ann. c. 27 Pr.	16 May 1711
An Act for confirming the Sale of the Estate of John Weston Esquire, in the County of Surrey; and discharging it from the Demands of the Crown.
Hubbald's Estate Act 1710	9 Ann. c. 28 Pr.	16 May 1711
An Act for the Sale of the Estates late of William Hubbald, and of his Father Edward Hubbald, in the County of Surrey, for the Satisfaction of the said William Hubbald's Debt to the Crown; and to preserve the Surplus thereof for the Purposes therein mentioned.
To explain and make more effectual a clause relating to the estate of Dame Rebecca Lytton in an Act for the payment of the debts of Sir John Bolles, a lunatic.	9 Ann. c. 29 Pr.	16 May 1711
An Act to explain and make more effectual a Clause relating to the Estate of Dame Rebecca Lytton, deceased, in an Act of Parliament made in the Seventh Year of Her Majesty's Reign, intituled, An Act for Payment of the Debts of Sir John Bolles Baronet, a Lunatic. (Note: 7 Ann. c. 28 Pr.)
Weller's Estate Act 1710	9 Ann. c. 30 Pr.	16 May 1711
An Act for vesting the Manor of Bucksteep, and several Lands in Sussex, the Estate of Joseph Weller Esquire, in Trustees, to be sold, for discharging the Incumbrances thereon; and applying the Surplus-money to certain Uses and Trusts therein mentioned.
Relief of Abraham Roth in relation to the purchase of part of the forfeited estates in Ireland.	9 Ann. c. 31 Pr.	16 May 1711
An Act for the Relief of Abraham Roth, of the Kingdom of Ireland, Esquire, in relation to the Purchase of Part of the forfeited Estates in Ireland.
Jones' Estate Act 1710	9 Ann. c. 32 Pr.	16 May 1711
An Act to enable Robert Jones, of Funmun Castle, in the County of Glamorgan, Esquire, to make Leases for Three Lives, or for Ninety-nine Years determinable on Three Lives, of the Manors, Lands, and Hereditaments, in the County of Glamorgan, limited to himself for Life by his Marriage Settlement; and for settling other Lands to the Use of that Settlement, in Lieu and Recompence of such Power.
Mugglestone's Estate Act 1710	9 Ann. c. 33 Pr.	16 May 1711
An Act for the Sale of certain Lands and Tithes, in the Parish of Tonge, in the County of Leicester, late the Estate of William Mugglestone, deceased; and for the Distribution of the Money thereby arising, pursuant to a Settlement made of the said Lands and Tithes by the said William Mugglestone.
Enabling Charles Viscount Cullen to sell the manor and advowson of the church of Elmesthorpe (Leicestershire) for payment of debts.	9 Ann. c. 34 Pr.	12 June 1711
An Act for enabling Charles Lord Viscount Cullen to sell the Manor and Advowson of the Church of Elmsthorp, in the County of Leicester, for the Payment of his Debts.
Biddulph's Estate Act 1710	9 Ann. c. 35 Pr.	12 June 1711
An Act for Sale of Part of the Estate of Theophilus Biddulph Esquire, for Payment of his Debts.
Lovett's Estate Act 1710	9 Ann. c. 36 Pr.	12 June 1711
An Act to enable Trustees to make Building Leases of Part of the Estate late of John Lovett deceased, lying in the City of Dublin.
Skeffington's Estate Act 1710	9 Ann. c. 37 Pr.	12 June 1711
An Act for Sale of Timber upon the Estate of Thomas Skeffington Esquire, an Infant, for Payment of his Father's Debts.
Confirmation of an agreement between Philip Saltmarsh and Thomas Bennet for the partition, division and exchange of estates in Nottinghamshire and Dorset.	9 Ann. c. 38 Pr.	12 June 1711
An Act for confirming an Agreement made between Philip Saltmarshe and Thomas Bennet Esquires, for a Partition, Division, and Exchange, of several Estates, in the Counties of Nottingham and Dorset, and other Purposes therein mentioned.
Brideoake's Estate Act 1710	9 Ann. c. 39 Pr.	12 June 1711
An Act for Sale of Part of the Estate of Richard Brideoake Esquire, in the County of Oxon (and charging other Part thereof with Two Annuities), for Payment and Satisfaction of several Incumbrances affecting his whole Estate; and for confirming an Agreement made between the said Richard Brideoake and others, claiming Common in Hook-Norton Warren and Hook-Norton Layes, in the same County.
Clerk's Estate Act 1710	9 Ann. c. 40 Pr.	12 June 1711
An Act for the Sale of the Manor of Frognall, and other Lands and Hereditaments, in the County of Kent, the Estate of George Clerk Esquire, for Payment of Debts; and settling an Estate, in the County of Leicester and City of London, to the same Uses as the Estate in Kent was settled.

=== Sources ===
- Raithby, John, ed. (1822). "Anno 9° Annæ, A.D. 1710". The Statutes of the Realm. Vol. 9: The Statutes of the Seventh to the Thirteenth Years of the Reign of Queen Anne. pp. 265–508 – via Internet Archive.
- Raithby, John, ed. (1822). "Anno 9° Annæ, A.D. 1710". The Statutes of the Realm. Vol. 9: The Statutes of the Seventh to the Thirteenth Years of the Reign of Queen Anne. pp. 265–508 – via HathiTrust.
- Pickering, Danby, ed. (1764). "Anno nono Annæ". The Statutes at Large. Vol. 12: From The Eighth to the Twelfth Year of Queen Anne. Cambridge: Joseph Bentham. pp. 88–278 – via Internet Archive.
- Journals of the House of Commons. Vol. 16. London: His Majesty's Stationery Office. 1803. pp. 401–692 – via Google Books.
- Journal of the House of Lords. Vol. 19: 1709-1714. London: His Majesty's Stationery Office. 1830. pp. 163–334 – via British History Online.
- Chronological Table of and Index to the Statutes. Vol. 1: To the End of the Session 59 Vict. Sess. 2 (1895) (13th ed.). London: Her Majesty's Stationery Office. 1896. p. 89-90 – via Google Books.
- Chronological Table of the Statutes: Covering the Period from 1235 to the End of 1971. London: Her Majesty's Stationery Office. 1972. pp. 86–87. ISBN 978-0-11-840096-1 – via Google Books.
- "Acts of the Parliament of Great Britain from 1710". legislation.gov.uk. The National Archives.

== See also ==
- List of acts of the Parliament of Great Britain
