= New Churches in London and Westminster Act 1710 =

Act of the Parliament of Great Britain

- Act of Parliament
- Parliament of Great Britain
- Long title: An Act for granting to Her Majesty several Duties upon Coals, for building Fifty new Churches in and about the Cities of London and Westminster, and Suburbs thereof, and other Purposes therein mentioned.
- Citation: 9 Ann. c. 17
- Territorial extent: Great Britain

Dates
- Royal assent: 12 June 1711
- Commencement: 25 November 1710 (Note: Start of session.)
- Repealed: 31 January 2013

Other legislation
- Amended by: Churches in London and Westminster Act 1711; Building of Churches, London and Westminster Act 1714
- Repealed by: Statute Law (Repeals) Act 2013
- Relates to: Saint Giles in the Fields Rebuilding Act 1717

Status: Repealed

Text of statute as originally enacted

Churches in London and Westminster Act 1711
- Act of Parliament
- Parliament of Great Britain
- Long title: An Act for enlarging the Time given to the Commissioners appointed by Her Majesty, pursuant to an Act for granting to Her Majesty several Duties on Coals, for building Fifty new Churches in and about the Cities of London and Westm'r, and Suburbs thereof, and other Purposes therein mentioned; and also for giving the said Commissioners farther Powers for better effecting the same; and for appointing Monies for re-building the Parish Church of St. Mary Woolnoth, in the City of London.
- Citation: 10 Ann. c. 20 (Note: This is the citation in The Statutes of the Realm); 10 Ann. c. 11 (Note: This is the citation in The Statutes at Large)
- Territorial extent: Great Britain

Dates
- Royal assent: 22 May 1712
- Commencement: 7 December 1711

Other legislation
- Amended by: London Coal Duties Abolition Act 1889
- Relates to: New Churches in London and Westminster Act 1710; Building of Churches, London and Westminster Act 1714; Saint Giles in the Fields Rebuilding Act 1717

Status: Amended

Text of statute as originally enacted

Building of Churches, London and Westminster Act 1714
- Act of Parliament
- Parliament of Great Britain
- Long title: An Act for making Provision for the Ministers of the Fifty new Churches, which are to be built in and about the Cities of London and Westminster, and Suburbs thereof; and for re-building and finishing the Parish Church of St. Mary Woolnoth, in the said City of London.
- Citation: 1 Geo. 1. St. 2. c. 23
- Territorial extent: Great Britain

Dates
- Royal assent: 21 September 1715
- Commencement: 17 March 1715
- Repealed: 31 January 2013

Other legislation
- Repealed by: Statute Law (Repeals) Act 2013
- Relates to: New Churches in London and Westminster Act 1710; Churches in London and Westminster Act 1711

Status: Repealed

Text of statute as originally enacted

The New Churches in London and Westminster Act 1710 (9 Ann. c. 17) was an act of the Parliament of Great Britain which set up the Commission for Building Fifty New Churches, with the purpose of building fifty new churches for the rapidly growing population of London.

== Subsequent developments ==
The whole act was repealed by section 1 of, and the group 1 of part 6 of the schedule to, the Statute Law (Repeals) Act 2013, which came into force on 31 January 2013.
