= Inland Revenue Repeal Act 1870 =

Act of the Parliament of the United Kingdom

Inland Revenue Repeal Act 1870 (Note: Section 1.)
- Act of Parliament
- Parliament of the United Kingdom
- Long title: An Act for the repeal of certain Enactments relating to the Inland Revenue.
- Citation: 33 & 34 Vict. c. 99
- Introduced by: Robert Lowe MP (Commons)
- Territorial extent: United Kingdom

Dates
- Royal assent: 10 August 1870
- Commencement: 1 January 1871 (Note: Section 1.)
- Repealed: 23 May 1950
Other legislation
Amends	See § Repealed enactments
Repeals/revokes	See § Repealed enactments
Repealed by	Statute Law Revision Act 1950
Relates to	Stamp Act 1870; Stamp Duties Management Act 1870

Status: Repealed

History of passage through Parliament

Records of Parliamentary debate relating to the statute from Hansard

Text of statute as originally enacted

The Inland Revenue Repeal Act 1870 (33 & 34 Vict. c. 99) was an act of the Parliament of the United Kingdom that repealed various enactments relating to duty taxes in the United Kingdom from 1764 to 1868.

== Background ==
In 1870, bills were introduced to amend and consolidate the law that had evolved over the last century relating to stamp duty and other inland revenue.

The Stamp Duties Bill — "for granting certain Stamp Duties in lieu of Duties of the same kind now payable under various Acts, and consolidating and amending provisions relating thereto" — contained no repeals of previous statutes, concerning Members of Parliament, including Robert Bourke MP. However, in Parliament, the Chancellor of the Exchequer, Robert Lowe MP, said that upon the passing of that bill, there would have to be brought in another bill to do so.

== Passage ==
Leave to bring in a Draft Stamp Duty Consolidation Bills to the House of Commons was granted to the John George Dodson MP, Chancellor of the Exchequer, Robert Lowe MP and James Stansfeld MP on 12 April 1870, following resolutions of the Committee of ways and means.

The Inland Revenue Acts Repeal Bill had its first reading in the House of Commons on 26 May 1870, presented by the Chancellor of the Exchequer, Robert Lowe MP. The bill had its second reading in the House of Commons on 12 July 1870 and was committed to the same committee of the whole house as the same time as the Stamp Duties Bill and the Stamp Duties Management Bill Bill, which met and reported on 4 August 1870, without amendments. The bill had its third reading in the House of Commons on 5 August 1870 and passed, without amendments.

The bill had its first reading in the House of Lords on 5 August 1870. The bill had its second reading in the House of Lords on 8 August 1870 and was committed to a committee of the whole house, which met and reported on 8 August 1870, with amendments. The amended bill had its third reading in the House of Lords on 9 August 1870 and passed, without amendments.

The bill was granted royal assent on 10 August 1870.

== Subsequent developments ==
The Stamp Act 1870 (33 & 34 Vict. c. 97) and the Stamp Duties Management Act 1870 (c. 98) were passed at the same time to amend and consolidate the law that had evolved over the last century relating to stamp duty and other inland revenue. These acts represented the beginning of a larger process to reform stamp duty law.

The Stamp Act 1891 (54 & 55 Vict. c. 38) and the Stamp Duties Management Act 1891 (c. 39) were passed in 1891 to amend and consolidate the law relating to stamp duty and other inland revenue, rendering these acts obsolete.

The whole act was repealed by section 1(1) of, and the first schedule to, the Statute Law Revision Act 1950 (14 Geo. 6. c. 6), which came into force on 23 May 1950.

== Repealed enactments ==
Section 1 of the act specified the repeals would take effect from 1 January 1871.

Section 2 of the act repealed over 100 enactments, listed in the schedule to the act. Section 2 of the act included several safeguard to ensure that past actions, stamp duties, and ongoing legal proceedings under those laws remain valid. This preserved the effects of the repealed laws up until 1 January 1871, when the repeal took effect.

Citation	Short title	Title	Extent of repeal
5 & 6 W. & M. c. 21	Stamps Act 1694	An Act for granting to their Majesties several duties, &c.	The whole act.
6 & 7 W. & M. c. 6	Marriage Duty Act 1694	An Act for granting to His Majesty certain rates, &c.	The whole act.
6 & 7 W. & M. c. 12	Stamps (Amendment) Act 1694	An Act for explaining and regulating certain doubts, &c.	The whole act.
7 & 8 Will. 3 c. 35	Marriage Duty Act 1695	An Act for the enforcing the laws which restrain marriage, &c.	The whole act.
9 Will. 3 c. 25	Stamps Act 1697	An Act for granting to His Majesty, His heirs and successors, further duties, &c.	The whole act.
1 Ann. st. 2 c. 19	Stamps Act 1702	An Act for preventing frauds in Her Majesty's duties, &c.	The whole act.
8 Ann. c. 5	Stamps Act 1709	An Act for laying certain duties upon candles, &c.	The whole act.
9 Ann. c. 15	Stamps Act 1710	An Act for making good deficiencies, &c.	The whole act.
9 Ann. c. 16	Stamps (No. 2) Act 1710	An Act for licensing and regulating hackney coaches, &c.	The whole act.
10 Ann. c. 18	Taxation Act 1711	An Act for laying several duties, &c.	The whole act, except section 198.
10 Ann. c. 19	Customs and Excise Act 1711	An Act for laying additional duties, &c.	The whole act.
13 Ann. c. 18	Stamps Act 1713	An Act for laying additional duties, &c.	The whole act.
6 Geo. 1 c. 21	Excise Act 1719	An Act for preventing frauds and abuses, &c.	The whole act.
18 Geo. 2 c. 22	Stamps Act 1744	An Act for granting to His Majesty the sum of 800,000l., &c.	The whole act.
20 Geo. 2 c. 45	Stamps Act 1746	An Act to continue several laws, &c.	The whole act.
30 Geo. 2 c. 19	National Debt Act 1757	An Act for granting to His Majesty several rates, &c.	Sections from 1 to 27, both inclusive, and 74 and 75.
2 Geo. 3 c. 36	Stamps Act 1762	An Act for better securing, &c.	The whole act.
5 Geo. 3 c. 35	Stamp Act 1765	An Act for granting to His Majesty certain duties, &c.	The whole act.
5 Geo. 3 c. 46	Stamp (No. 2) Act 1765	An Act for altering the stamp duties, &c.	The whole act.
6 Geo. 3 c. 40	Stamps Act 1766	An Act for explaining and amending, &c.	The whole act.
7 Geo. 3 c. 44	Stamps (No. 2) Act 1766	An Act for altering the stamp duties on policies of assurance, &c.	The whole act.
8 Geo. 3 c. 25	Stamps Act 1768	An Act for reducing the duties on foul salt, &c.	The whole act.
12 Geo. 3 c. 48	Stamps Act 1772	An Act for the more effectual preventing of frauds, &c.	The whole act.
16 Geo. 3 c. 34	Taxation Act 1776	An Act for granting to His Majesty several duties, &c.	Sections from 1 to 16, both inclusive.
17 Geo. 3 c. 50	Auctioneers' Licences Act 1776	An Act for granting to His Majesty certain duties, &c.	The whole act.
25 Geo. 3 c. 80	Stamps Act 1785	An Act for granting to His Majesty certain duties, &c.	The whole act.
26 Geo. 3 c. 48	Stamps Act 1786	An Act for granting to His Majesty certain duties, &c.	The whole act.
26 Geo. 3 c. 82	Stamps (No. 3) Act 1786	An Act for the more effectually carrying into execution, &c.	The whole act.
27 Geo. 3 c. 13	Customs and Excise Act 1787	An Act for repealing the several duties of customs and excise, &c.	Sections 41 to 46, both inclusive.
31 Geo. 3 c. 25	Stamps Act 1791	An Act for repealing the duties now charged on bills of exchange, &c.	The whole act.
34 Geo. 3 c. 14	Stamps (No. 3) Act 1794	An Act for granting to His Majesty certain stamp duties, &c.	The whole act.
35 Geo. 3 c. 55	Stamps (No. 2) Act 1795	An Act for granting to His Majesty certain additional duties on receipts.	The whole act.
37 Geo. 3 c. 19	Stamps (No. 2) Act 1796	An Act for the more effectually securing the stamp duties, &c.	The whole act.
37 Geo. 3 c. 90	Stamps (No. 2) Act 1797	An Act for granting to His Majesty certain stamp duties, &c.	The whole act.
37 Geo. 3 c. 136	Stamps (No. 4) Act 1797	An Act to enable the Commissioners of Stamp Duties, &c.	The whole act.
38 Geo. 3 c. 56	Stamps Act 1798	An Act for repealing so much of an Act, &c.	The whole act.
38 Geo. 3 c. 85	Stamps (No. 2) Act 1798	An Act for explaining and amending certain Acts, &c.	The whole act.
39 Geo. 3 c. 92	Scotch Distilleries Act 1798	An Act for altering the period, &c.	The whole act.
39 Geo. 3 c. 107	Stamps (No. 3) Act 1799	An Act for granting to His Majesty certain stamp duties, &c.	The whole act.
39 & 40 Geo. 3 c. 72	Administration of Estates (Probate) Act 1800	An Act to amend several laws, &c.	The whole act, except section 16.
39 & 40 Geo. 3 c. 84	Stamps Act 1800	An Act to render valid, &c.	The whole act.
42 Geo. 3 c. 99	Stamps Act 1802	An Act for allowing the stamping certain deeds, &c.	The whole act.
43 Geo. 3 c. 126	Stamps (No. 2) Act 1803	An Act for granting to His Majesty certain duties on receipts.	The whole act.
43 Geo. 3 c. 127	Stamps (No. 3) Act 1803	An Act for consolidating the duties, &c.	The whole act.
44 Geo. 3 c. 59	Certificates of Attorneys, etc. Act 1804	An Act to indemnify solicitors, attorneys, and others, &c.	Sections 1 and 2.
44 Geo. 3 c. 98	Stamp Act 1804	An Act to repeal the several duties, &c.	The whole act, except so far as it relates to the duties on medicines and on licences for vending the same.
46 Geo. 3 c. 43	Appraisers Licences Act 1806	An Act for granting to His Majesty certain stamp duties, &c.	The whole act, except sections 4, 5, 6, and 7.
48 Geo. 3 c. 149	Probate and Legacy Duties Act 1808	An Act for repealing the stamp duties, &c.	Sections 1 to 34, both inclusive, and 45, 48, and 49.
50 Geo. 3 c. 35	Stamps Act 1810	An Act for altering the mode of collecting, &c.	The whole act.
53 Geo. 3 c. 108	Stamps Act 1813	An Act for altering, explaining, and amending, &c.	The whole act.
54 Geo. 3 c. 144	Stamps Act 1814	An Act for better securing, &c.	The whole act.
55 Geo. 3 c. 100	Stamp Duties (Ireland) Act 1815	An Act to provide for the collection and management, &c.	The whole act, except sections 19 and 20.
55 Geo. 3 c. 101	Stamps Act 1815	An Act to regulate the collection of stamp duties, &c.	The whole act.
55 Geo. 3 c. 184	Stamp Act 1815	An Act for repealing the stamp duties on deeds, &c.	Sections 1, 3 to 20, both inclusive, 29, 30, and 31; section 2, except so far as it relates to the duties contained in the 3rd part of the Schedule and to licences to bankers and pawnbrokers. Part 1 of the Schedule, except so far as it relates to licences to bankers and pawnbrokers; and Part 2 of the Schedule.
55 Geo. 3 c. 185	Plate Duties Act 1815	An Act for repealing the Stamp Office duties on advertisements, &c.	The whole act, except so far as it relates to the duties on plate.
56 Geo. 3 c. 56	Probate Duty (Ireland) Act 1816	An Act to repeal the several stamp duties in Ireland, &c.	The whole act, except sections 115 to 131, both inclusive.
1 & 2 Geo. 4 c. 55	Stamps Act 1821	An Act to remove doubts, &c.	The whole act.
3 Geo. 4 c. 117	Stamps Act 1822	An Act to reduce the stamp duties on reconveyances of mortgages, &c.	The whole act.
5 Geo. 4 c. 41	Stamps Act 1824	An Act to repeal certain duties on law proceedings, &c.	The whole act.
6 Geo. 4 c. 41	Stamps Act 1825	An Act to repeal the stamp duties payable in Great Britain and Ireland, &c.	The whole act.
7 Geo. 4 c. 44	Stamps Act 1826	An Act to allow, &c.	The whole act.
9 Geo. 4 c. 27	Receipt Stamps Act 1828	An Act to repeal the allowances made to stationers, &c.	The whole act.
9 Geo. 4 c. 49	Stamp Duties Act 1828	An Act to amend the laws in force relating to the stamp duties on sea insurances, &c.	The whole act, except so much of section 12 as relates to licences to pawnbrokers.
2 & 3 Will. 4 c. 91	Stamps Act 1832	An Act to explain doubts, &c.	The whole act.
3 & 4 Will. 4 c. 23	Stamps Act 1833	An Act to reduce the stamp duties on advertisements, &c.	The whole act.
3 & 4 Will. 4 c. 97	Stamps, etc. Act 1833	An Act to prevent the selling and uttering of forged stamps, &c.	The whole act, except sections 20 and 21.
4 & 5 Will. 4 c. 57	Stamps Act 1834	An Act to repeal the stamp duties on almanacks, &c.	The whole act.
5 & 6 Will. 4 c. 64	Stamp Duties Act 1835	An Act to alter certain duties, &c.	Sections 1, 2, and 7.
6 & 7 Will. 4 c. 76	Stamp Duties on Newspapers Act 1836	An Act to reduce the duties on newspapers, &c.	The whole act.
1 & 2 Vict. c. 85	Stamps Act 1838	An Act to authorise the using, &c.	The whole act.
3 & 4 Vict. c. 79	Stamps Act 1840	An Act to amend the law relating to the admission, &c.	The whole act.
4 & 5 Vict. c. 34	Stamps Act 1841	An Act to explain and amend an Act, &c.	The whole act.
5 & 6 Vict. c. 79	Railway Passenger Duty Act 1842	An Act to repeal the duties payable on stage carriages, &c.	Sections 3, 21, and 22, and so much of the Schedule as relates to the stamp duties on instruments, &c. thereby granted.
5 & 6 Vict. c. 82	Stamp Duties (Ireland) Act 1842	An Act to assimilate the stamp duties in Great Britain and Ireland, &c.	The whole act, except so far as it relates to—(1) Duties contained in the 3d part of the Schedule to 55 Geo. 3. c. 184. (2) Licences to bankers, pawnbrokers, and appraisers. (3) Composition for duties on banker's notes. (4) Duties on, and licences to deal in, plate.
6 & 7 Vict. c. 72	Stamps Act 1843	An Act to impose certain stamp duties, &c.	The whole act.
7 & 8 Vict. c. 21	Stamps Act 1844	An Act to reduce the stamp duties on policies of sea insurance, &c.	The whole act.
8 & 9 Vict. c. 76	Revenue Act 1845	An Act to increase the stamp duty on licences to appraisers, &c.	Sections 2 and 3.
12 & 13 Vict. c. 80	Stamps Act 1849	An Act to repeal the allowances on the purchase of stamps, &c.	The whole act, except so much of section 2 as relates to the allowance for receiving duty on plate.
13 & 14 Vict. c. 97	Stamp Duties Act 1850	An Act to repeal certain stamp duties, &c.	The whole act, except section 8, so far as it relates to money received as and for the duty upon or in respect of any legacy or residue.
16 & 17 Vict. c. 59	Stamp Act 1853	An Act to repeal certain stamp duties, &c.	The whole act, except sections 8, 17, 19, and 20, and also section 20, so far as it continues or perpetuates any enactment hereby repealed.
16 & 17 Vict. c. 63	Bankers' Composition (Scotland) Act 1853	An Act to repeal certain stamp duties, &c.	The whole act, except section 7.
16 & 17 Vict. c. 71	Newspapers Act 1853	An Act to amend the law relating to the stamp duties on newspapers.	The whole act.
17 & 18 Vict. c. 83	Stamp Act 1854	An Act to amend the laws relating to the stamp duties.	The whole act, except sections 1, 11, 12, and 20.
17 & 18 Vict. c. 125	Common Law Procedure Act 1854	An Act for the further amendment of the process, practice, and mode of pleading, &c.	Sections 28 and 29.
18 & 19 Vict. c. 27	Newspapers Act 1855	An Act to amend the law relating to the stamp duties on newspapers, &c.	The whole act.
18 & 19 Vict. c. 78	Inland Revenue Act 1855	An Act to reduce certain duties, &c.	Section 5.
19 & 20 Vict. c. 22	Inland Revenue Act 1855	An Act to amend the laws relating to the duties on fire insurances.	The whole act.
19 & 20 Vict. c. 81	Stamps (No. 2) Act 1856	An Act to reduce the stamp duties on certain instruments of proxy, &c.	The whole act.
19 & 20 Vict. c. 102	Common Law Procedure Amendment Act (Ireland) 1856	An Act to further amend the procedure in and to enlarge the jurisdiction of the superior courts of common law in Ireland.	Sections 34 and 35.
21 & 22 Vict. c. 20	Stamps Act 1858	An Act for granting a stamp duty on certain drafts, &c.	The whole act.
21 & 22 Vict. c. 24	Stamps (No. 2) Act 1858	An Act to reduce the stamp duties on passports.	The whole act.
23 & 24 Vict. c. 15	Probate Duty Act 1860	An Act for granting to Her Majesty certain duties of stamps.	The whole act, except sections 4, 5, and 6.
23 & 24 Vict. c. 111	Stamp Duties Act 1860	An Act for granting to Her Majesty certain duties of stamps, &c.	Sections 1 to 18, both inclusive, and the schedule.
24 & 25 Vict. c. 21	Revenue (No. 1) Act 1861	An Act for granting to Her Majesty certain duties of excise and stamps.	Sections 14 and 15, and so much of Schedule (B.) as relates to the duties on bills of exchange and on leases or tacks, and the duplicates or counterparts thereof.
24 & 25 Vict. c. 50	Railway Companies Mortgage Transfer (Scotland) Act 1861	An Act for facilitating the transfer of mortgages and bonds, &c.	The whole act.
24 & 25 Vict. c. 91	Revenue (No. 2) Act 1861	An Act to amend the laws relating to the Inland Revenue.	Sections 25, 26, 27, 28, 30, 31, 32, 33, and 34.
25 & 26 Vict. c. 22	Revenue Act 1862	An Act to continue certain duties, &c.	Section 38, and so much of Schedule (C.) as relates to the stamp duty on foreign bonds or securities.
27 & 28 Vict. c. 18	Revenue (No. 1) Act 1864	An Act to grant certain duties of Customs and Inland Revenue.	Sections 11, 12, 13, and 14, and Schedule (C.)
27 & 28 Vict. c. 56	Revenue (No. 2) Act 1864	An Act for granting to Her Majesty certain stamp duties, &c.	Sections 2, 3, 16, and 17.
27 & 28 Vict. c. 90	Stamp Act 1864	An Act to amend an Act of the present session, chapter 18, &c.	The whole act.
28 & 29 Vict. c. 96	Revenue (No. 2) Act 1865	An Act to amend the laws relating to the Inland Revenue.	Sections 1 to 7, both inclusive, 10 to 17, both inclusive, 19 to 22, both inclusive, and 30.
29 & 30 Vict. c. 64	Inland Revenue Act 1866	An Act to amend the laws relating to the Inland Revenue.	Section 16.
30 & 31 Vict. c. 90	Revenue Act 1867	An Act to alter certain duties, &c.	Sections 20 to 24, both inclusive.
30 & 31 Vict. c. 96	Debts Recovery (Scotland) Act 1867	An Act to facilitate the recovery of certain debts, &c.	Section 23.
31 & 32 Vict. c. 100	Court of Session Act 1868	An Act to amend the procedure in the Court of Session, &c.	Section 41, except so far as it relates to the deliverance of the judge, and section 42.
31 & 32 Vict. c. 124	Inland Revenue Act 1868	An Act to amend the laws relating to the Inland Revenue.	Sections 10, 11, and 12.

== See also ==
- Statute Law Revision Act
