= British India Steam Navigation Co v IRC =

British law case

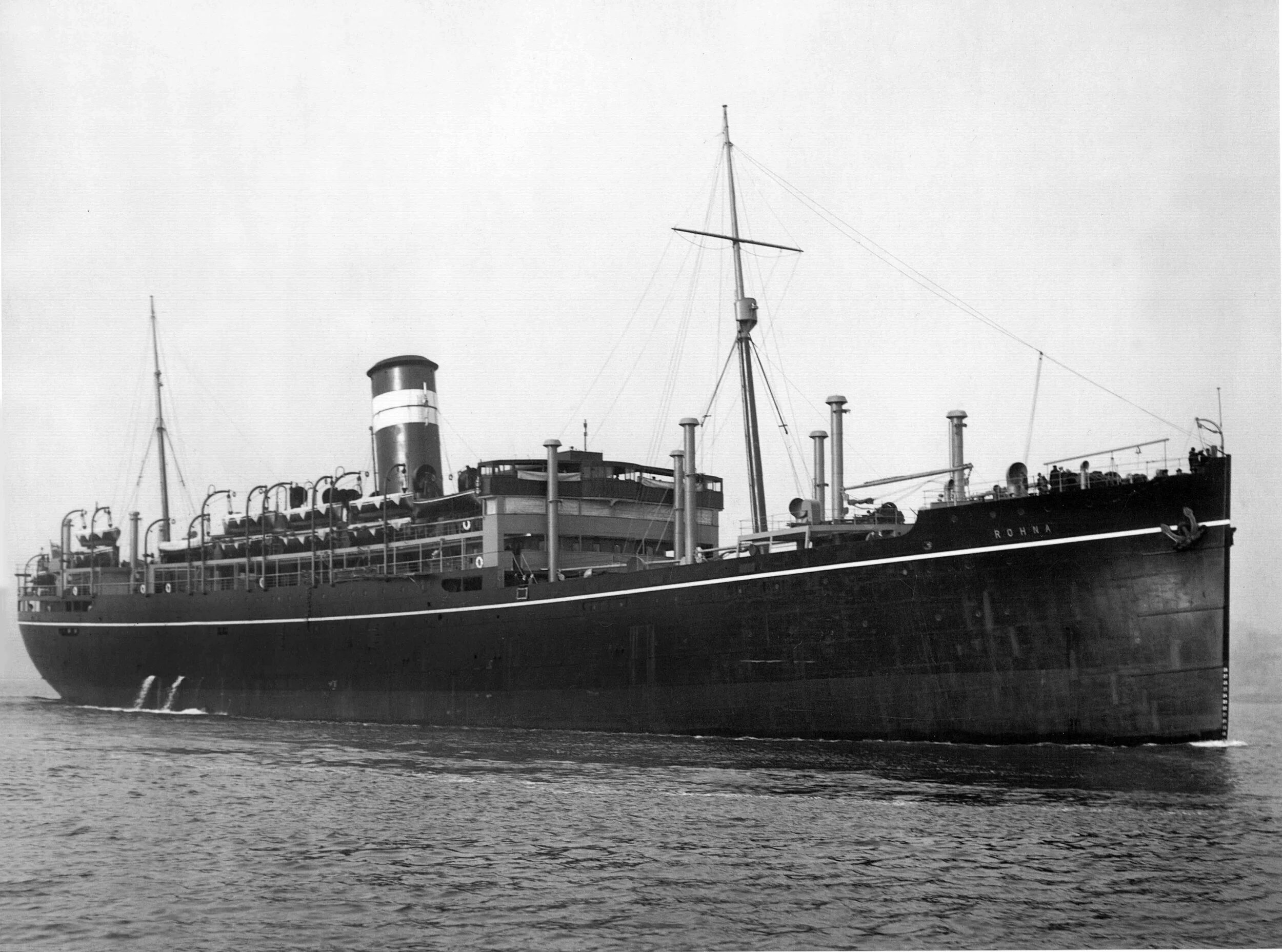
- Court: High Court
- Citation: (1881) 7 QBD 165

Court membership
- Judge sitting: Lindley J

Keywords
- Security interest, debenture

British India Steam Navigation Co v Inland Revenue Commissioners (1881) 7 QBD 165 is a case relevant for UK commercial law and UK insolvency law case, concerning the definition of a debenture.

== Facts ==
The British India Steam Navigation Company had undertaken on paper to pay the holder £100 on 30 November 1882 and pay interest half yearly at 5% pa. The paper said these were “debentures”. Meanwhile, the Stamp Act 1870, a taxation statute, said that “debentures” were subject to a higher rate of stamp duty. The company then tried to argue that in fact these were not debentures at all, and merely a “promissory note”. A. V. Dicey and Farrer Herschell QC appeared for the Revenue.

== Judgment ==
Lindley J held that the instruments were debentures and therefore subject to stamp duty. They were debentures because they were documents that acknowledged a debt.

Now, what the correct meaning of ‘debenture’ is I do not know. I do not find anywhere any precise definition of it. We know that there are various kinds of instruments commonly called debentures. You may have mortgage debentures, which are charges of some kind on property. You may have debentures which are bonds; and, if this instrument were under seal, it would be a debentures of that kind. You may have a debenture which is nothing more than an acknowledgement of indebtedness. And you may have [as on the facts]… a statement by two directors that the company will pay a certain sum of money on a given day, and will also pay interest half-yearly at certain times and at a certain place upon production of certain coupons by the holder of the instrument. I think any of these things which I have referred to may be debentures within the Act.

== See also ==
- UK insolvency law
