= Stamp Act 1870 =

Act of the Parliament of the United Kingdom

Stamp Act 1870 (Note: Section 1.)
- Act of Parliament
- Parliament of the United Kingdom
- Long title: An Act for granting certain Stamp Duties in lieu of Duties of the same kind now payable under various Acts, and consolidating and amending provisions relating thereto.
- Citation: 33 & 34 Vict. c. 97
- Introduced by: James Stansfeld MP (Commons)
- Territorial extent: United Kingdom

Dates
- Royal assent: 10 August 1870
- Commencement: 1 January 1871 (Note: Section 1.)
- Repealed: 1 January 1892
Other legislation
Amended by	Stamps Act 1871; House Tax Act 1871; Customs and Inland Revenue Act 1872; Stamp Duties Management Act 1891
Repealed by	Stamp Act 1891
Relates to	Stamp Duties Management Act 1870; Inland Revenue Repeal Act 1870; Stamp Duties Management Act 1891; Stamp Act 1891

Status: Repealed

History of passage through Parliament

Records of Parliamentary debate relating to the statute from Hansard

Text of statute as originally enacted

The Stamp Act 1870 (33 & 34 Vict. c. 97) was an act of the Parliament of the United Kingdom that consolidated enactments relating to stamp duty in the United Kingdom.

== Background ==
In 1870, bills were introduced to amend and consolidate the law that had evolved over the last century relating to stamp duty and other inland revenue.

The Stamp Duties Bill — "for granting certain Stamp Duties in lieu of Duties of the same kind now payable under various Acts, and consolidating and amending provisions relating thereto" — contained no repeals of previous statutes, concerning Members of Parliament, including Robert Bourke MP. However, in Parliament, the Chancellor of the Exchequer, Robert Lowe MP, said that upon the passing of that bill, there would have to be brought in another bill to do so.

== Passage ==
Leave to bring in a Draft Stamp Duty Consolidation Bills to the House of Commons was granted to the John George Dodson MP, Chancellor of the Exchequer, Robert Lowe MP and James Stansfeld MP on 12 April 1870, following resolutions of the Committee of ways and means.

The Stamp Duties Bill had its first reading in the House of Commons on 21 May 1870, presented by James Stansfeld MP. The bill had its second reading in the House of Commons on 30 May 1870 and was committed to a committee of the whole house, which met and reported on 12 July 1870, with amendments. The amended bill was re-committed to a committee of the whole house, which met and reported on 2 August 1870, with amendments. The amended bill was re-committed to the same committee of the whole house as the same time as the Stamp Duties Bill and the Inland Revenue Acts Repeal Bill, which met and reported on 4 August 1870, without amendments. The bill had its third reading in the House of Commons on 5 August 1870 and passed, without amendments.

The bill had its first reading in the House of Lords on 5 August 1870. The bill had its second reading in the House of Lords on 8 August 1870 and was committed to a committee of the whole house, which met and reported on 8 August 1870, with amendments. The amended bill had its third reading in the House of Lords on 9 August 1870 and passed, without amendments.

The bill was granted royal assent on 10 August 1870.

== Subsequent developments ==
The act was described as a Consolidation Act.

The Stamp Duties Management Act 1870 (33 & 34 Vict. c. 98) and the Inland Revenue Repeal Act 1870 (c. 99) were passed at the same time to amend and consolidate the law that had evolved over the last century relating to stamp duty and other inland revenue. These acts represented the beginning of a larger process to reform stamp duty law.

The act was amended in the following session by the Stamps Act 1871 (34 & 35 Vict. c. 4) and the House Tax Act 1871 (c. 103).

The whole act was repealed by section 123 of, and the third schedule to, the Stamp Act 1891 (54 & 55 Vict. c. 39), which came into force on 1 January 1892. The 1891 act was passed at the same time as the Stamp Duties Management Act 1891 (c. 38).

== See also ==
- Statute Law Revision Act
