= Stamp Duties on Cards and Dice Act 1828 =

Act of the Parliament of the United Kingdom

- Act of Parliament
- Parliament of the United Kingdom
- Long title: An Act to repeal the Stamp Duties on Cards and Dice made in the United Kingdom, and to grant other Duties in lieu thereof; and to amend and consolidate the Acts relating to such Cards and Dice, and the Exportation thereof.
- Citation: 9 Geo. 4. c. 18
- Territorial extent: United Kingdom

Dates
- Royal assent: 9 May 1828
- Commencement: 5 July 1828 (Note: Section 39.)
- Repealed: 1 September 1862
Other legislation
Repeals/revokes	See § Repealed enactments
Repealed by	Revenue Act 1862

Status: Repealed

Text of statute as originally enacted

The Stamp Duties on Cards and Dice Act 1828 (9 Geo. 4. c. 18) was an act of the Parliament of the United Kingdom that consolidated enactments related to the stamp duties on playing cards and dice in the United Kingdom.

== Provisions ==
Section 2 of the act granted duties of five shillings on every annual licence to make playing cards or dice, one shilling on every pack of playing cards made fit for sale or use in the United Kingdom, and twenty shillings on every pair of dice so made. The duties were placed under the care and management of the Commissioners of Stamps.

=== Repealed enactments ===
Section 1 of the act repealed 10 enactments, listed in that section. The repeal did not affect the operation of any of the repealed acts in so far as they repealed any other act, or affect duties or arrears of duty payable, or penalties incurred, under the repealed acts before the commencement of the act, which remained recoverable as if the act had not been made, or the bonds given under them, which continued in force until their conditions were performed.

Citation	Short title	Description	Extent of repeal
9 Ann. c. 16 (Note: This is the citation in The Statutes of the Realm.)	Stamps (No. 2) Act 1710	An Act made in the Ninth Year of the Reign of Queen Anne, for the Purpose, among other Things, of charging certain new Duties on stampt Vellum, Parchment, and Paper, and on Cards and Dice.	Sections 40 to 43.
10 Ann. c. 18 (Note: StatutesOfTheRealm)	Taxation Act 1711	An Act made in the Tenth Year of the Reign of the said Queen Anne, for the Purpose, among other Things, of charging certain Stocks of Cards and Dice, and for better securing Her Majesty's Duties to arise in the Office for the Stamp Duties.	Sections 162, 163 and 166 to 170.
6 Geo. 1. c. 21	Excise Act 1719	An Act for preventing Frauds and Abuses in the Public Revenues of Excise, Customs, Stamp Duties, Post Office, and House Money.	Sections 55, 57, 59 and 60.
29 Geo. 2. c. 13	Taxation (No. 2) Act 1756	An Act for granting to His Majesty an additional Duty on Cards and Dice.	So much as relates to the duties on playing cards and dice, to the collection and regulation of those duties, and to the exportation of cards and dice.
5 Geo. 3. c. 46	Stamp (No. 2) Act 1765	An Act for altering the Stamp Duties on Admissions into Corporations or Companies, and for further securing and improving the Stamp Duties in Great Britain.	Sections 9 to 17 and 41.
16 Geo. 3. c. 34	Taxation Act 1776	An Act made in the Sixteenth Year of the Reign of King George the Third, among other Purposes, for granting to His Majesty several Duties on Cards, Dice, and Newspapers.	Section 17.
41 Geo. 3. c. 86	Probate Duty Act 1801	An Act for granting to His Majesty additional Stamp Duties on Cards and Dice, on Probates of Wills, on certain Indentures, Leases, Bonds, or other Deeds, and on Ale Licences.	Section 4.
44 Geo. 3. c. 98	Stamp Act 1804	An Act to repeal the several Duties under the Commissioners for managing the Duties upon stamped Vellum, Parchment, and Paper in Great Britain, and to grant new and additional Duties in lieu thereof.	So much as relates to the duties on playing cards and dice, to the collection and regulation of those duties, and to the exportation of cards and dice. Also all licences granted to makers of cards or dice under the act.
55 Geo. 3. c. 101	Stamps Act 1815	An Act to regulate the Collection of Stamp Duties on Matters in respect of which Licences may be granted by the Commissioners of Stamps in Ireland.	So much as relates to the duties on playing cards and dice, to the collection and regulation of those duties, and to the exportation of cards and dice.
56 Geo. 3. c. 56	Probate Duty (Ireland) Act 1816	An Act to repeal the several Stamp Duties in Ireland, and also several Acts for the Collection and Management of the said Duties, and to grant new Stamp Duties in lieu thereof; and to make more effectual Regulations for collecting and managing the said Duties.	So much as relates to the duties on playing cards and dice, to the collection and regulation of those duties, and to the exportation of cards and dice. Also all licences granted to makers of cards or dice under the act.

== Subsequent developments ==
The whole act was repealed by section 27 of the Revenue Act 1862 (25 & 26 Vict. c. 22), which came into force on 1 September 1862, except as to duties unpaid, penalties incurred and bonds given under the act.
