= Land Transaction Tax =

Property tax in Wales

Land Transaction Tax (LTT) (Welsh: Treth Trafodiadau Tir (TTT)) is a property tax in Wales. It replaced the Stamp Duty Land Tax from 1 April 2018. It became the first Welsh tax in almost 800 years.

An explanation of the tax system in Wales, including the Land Transaction Tax.

LTT is a tax applied to residential and commercial land and buildings transactions (including commercial purchases and commercial leases) where a chargeable interest is acquired. Under the Land Transaction Tax and Anti-avoidance of Devolved Taxes (Wales) Act 2017, a land transaction must be notified to the Welsh Revenue Authority unless it falls within one of the exempt categories contained in the Act.

The Welsh Revenue Authority administers and collects LTT with support from HM Land Registry.

== Overview ==
LTT is usually paid by the solicitor on behalf of the buyer, within 30 days of completion as part of the administrative process to complete the conveyancing transaction, although final responsibility lies with the buyer. Submitting an LTT return and making arrangements to pay the LTT due is a prerequisite for applying for registration of title. LTT is a progressive tax, with its structure designed so that the charge rises more than proportionately to the actual price of the property. The percentage rate for each band in LTT is applied only to the band of the purchase price over the relevant threshold and up to the next threshold.

Proposals for rates and bands were announced by the Minister for Finance Mark Drakeford on 11 December 2017, as part of the annual Draft Budget process and tax calculators are available to help taxpayers and agents determine the amount of LTT due. The proposed tax rates and bands are subject to consultation and Parliamentary scrutiny through the Draft Budget process, led by the Finance Committee of the Senedd.

== Rates and bands ==
=== Residential property transactions ===
For residential property transactions made on or after 10 October 2022, the rate of tax is determined by reference to percentages of the chargeable consideration for the transaction falling within the proposed bands below:

Purchase price	LTT rate
Up to and including £225,000	0%
Over £225,000 up to and including £400,000	6%
Over £400,000 up to and including £750,000	7.5%
Over £750,000 up to and including £1,500,000	10%
Above £1,500,000	12%

=== Higher residential property rates ===
The following rates apply for purchasers who already own one or more properties. For purchasers who are replacing their main residence the higher rates may not apply. Companies buying residential properties will have to pay the residential higher rates, as will trusts.

Purchase price	LTT rate
Up to £180,000	3%
From £180,000 to £250,000	6.5%
From £250,000 to £400,000	8%
From £400,000 to £750,000	10.5%
From £750,000 to £1,500,000	13%
Above £1,500,000	15%

The LTT rates increased from the above levels by 1% on 21 December 2020 and by a further 1% in December 2024.

=== Non-residential property tax rates ===
The following rates apply for freeholds or leaseholds of shops, offices, or agricultural land.

Purchase price	LTT rate
Up to £150,000	0%
From £150,000 to £250,000	1%
From £250,000 to £1,000,000	5%
Above £1,000,000	6%

=== Non-residential property rent ===
For rent on the grant of a lease, the lease premium will not be included in the 0% tax band. Rent over the term of the new lease is liable, calculated on the property's net present value (NPV).

NPV threshold	LTT rate
Up to £150,000	0%
From £150,000 to £2,000,000	1%
Above £2,000,000	2%

Note: The thresholds increased by 50% from the above levels on 22/12/2020.

== Exemptions ==
The Land Transaction Tax and Anti-avoidance of Devolved Taxes (Wales) Act 2017 makes provision for the following exemptions from LTT:

- a "security interest", that is, an interest or right (other than a rentcharge) held for the purpose of securing the payment of money or the performance of any other obligation. The commonest example of a security interest is a mortgage.
- a licence to use or occupy land. (However, a document which describes itself as a licence may in fact be a lease, especially if the practical consequence is that the grantee has exclusive occupation.)
- a tenancy at will (however, a tenancy described as a tenancy at will may in fact be some other type of tenancy such as a periodic tenancy, especially if rent is paid)
- a franchise granted by the Crown: for example, the right to hold a market or to take tolls
- a manor (a "Lordship of the Manor" or seignory, but a seignory may be accompanied by chargeable interests such as profits à prendre).
