= Marriage Duty Act 1694 =

Act of the Parliament of England

- Act of Parliament
- Parliament of England
- Long title: An Act for granting to his Majesty certaine rates and duties upon Marriages Births and Burials and upon Batchelors and Widowers for the terme of Five yeares for carrying on the Warr against France with Vigour.
- Citation: 6 & 7 Will. & Mar. c. 6
- Territorial extent: England and Wales

Dates
- Royal assent: 22 April 1695
- Commencement: 1 May 1695 (Note: Section 1.)
- Repealed: 1 January 1871
Other legislation
Amended by	Statute Law Revision Act 1867
Repealed by	Inland Revenue Repeal Act 1870
Relates to	Marriage Duty Act 1695; Duties on Marriages etc. Act 1697

Status: Repealed

Text of statute as originally enacted

Marriage Duty Act 1695
- Act of Parliament
- Parliament of England
- Long title: An Act for the inforcing the Laws which restraine Marriages without Licence or Banns & for the better registring Marriags Births and Burials.
- Citation: 7 & 8 Will. 3. c. 35
- Territorial extent: England and Wales

Dates
- Royal assent: 27 April 1696
- Commencement: 24 June 1696 (Note: Section 1.)
- Repealed: 1 January 1871
Other legislation
Amends	Statute Law Revision Act 1867
Repealed by	Inland Revenue Repeal Act 1870
Relates to	Marriage Duty Act 1694; Duties on Marriages etc. Act 1697

Status: Repealed

Text of statute as originally enacted

Duties on Marriages etc. Act 1697
- Act of Parliament
- Parliament of England
- Long title: An Act for preventing Frauds and Abuses in the charging collecting & paying the Duties upon Marriages Births Burials Batchellors and Widowers.
- Citation: 9 Will. 3. c. 32 (Ruffhead: 9 & 10 Will. 3. c. 35)
- Territorial extent: England and Wales

Dates
- Royal assent: 5 July 1698
- Commencement: 3 December 1697 (Note: Start of session.)
- Repealed: 21 August 1871
Other legislation
Amended by	Statute Law Revision Act 1867
Repealed by	Statute Law Revision Act 1871
Relates to	Marriage Duty Act 1694; Marriage Duty Act 1695

Status: Repealed

Text of statute as originally enacted

The Marriage Duty Act 1694 (6 & 7 Will. & Mar. c. 6) was an act of the Parliament of England which imposed a tax, known as Marriage Duty or the Registration Tax, on births, marriages, burials, childless widowers, and bachelors over the age of 25. It was primarily used as a revenue raising mechanism for war on France and as a means of ensuring that proper records were kept by Anglican church officials. The tax was found ineffective and abolished by 1706.

== Subsequent development ==
The whole act, except sections 20 and 47, was repealed by section 1 of, and the schedule to, the Statute Law Revision Act 1867 (30 & 31 Vict. c. 59), which came into force on 15 July 1867.

The whole act was repealed by section 2 of, and the schedule to, the Inland Revenue Repeal Act 1870 (33 & 34 Vict. c. 99), which came into force on 1 January 1871.

== See also ==
- Bachelor tax
