= The Old Bell, Covent Garden =

Pub in Covent Garden, London, England

The Old Bell
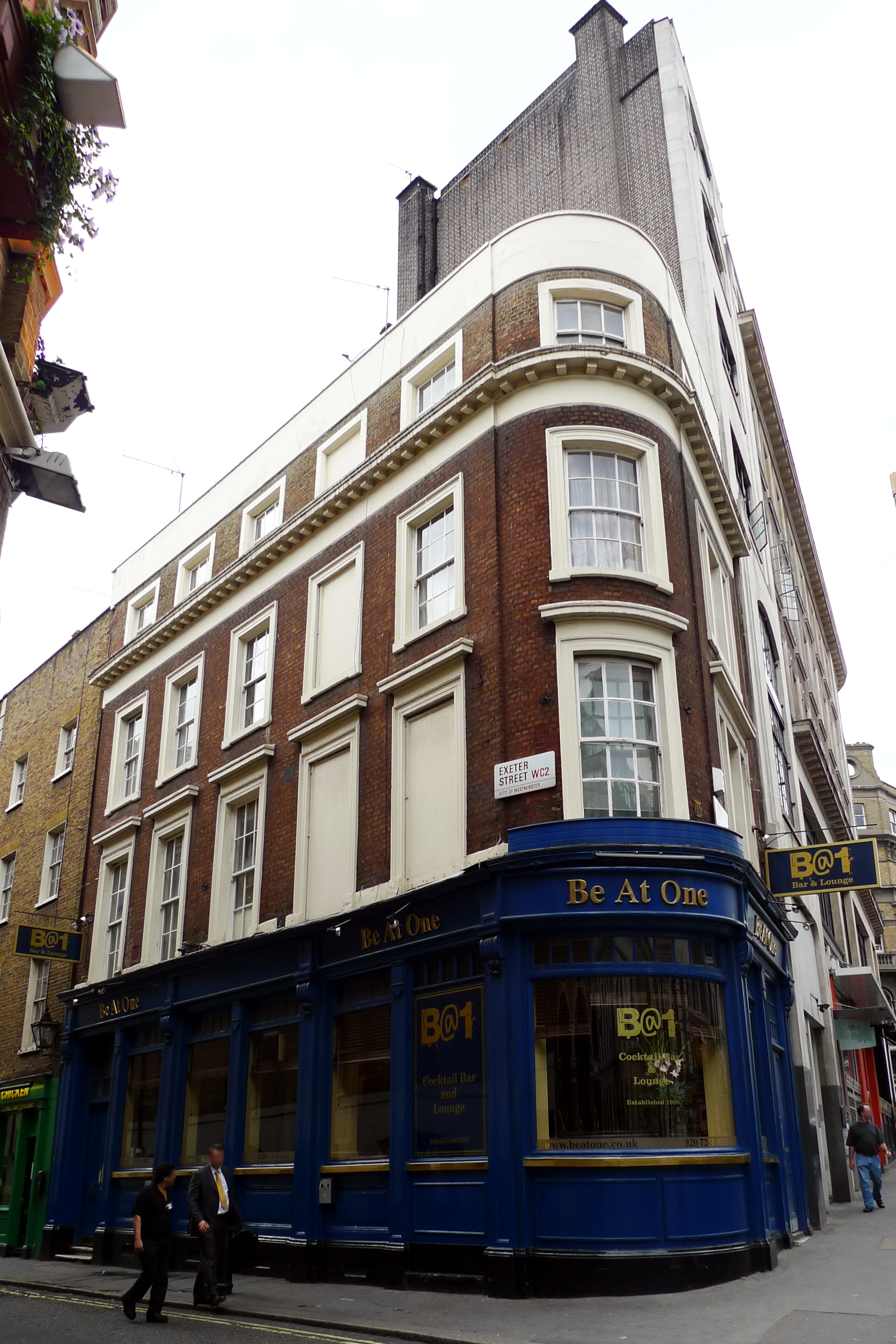
- The Old Bell, now Be At One
- Interactive map of The Old Bell
- 51°30′42.35″N 0°7′12.81″W
- Type: Public house
- Location: 16 Exeter Street and 23 Wellington Street, Covent Garden, London, WC2

History
- Built: 1835

Listed Building – Grade II
- Official name: THE OLD BELL PUBLIC HOUSE
- Designated: 15-Jan-1973
- Reference no.: 1211790

The Old Bell is a Grade II listed public house at 16 Exeter Street and 23 Wellington Street, Covent Garden, London, WC2.

It was built in 1835. It is now a branch of the pub chain Be At One.
