= Berthold's Political Handkerchief =

British newspaper

Berthold's Political Handkerchief was a radical newspaper published in London by the political writer Henry Berthold that was printed on cotton. This was done to avoid paying the stamp duty on paper claiming that it wasn't a newspaper because it contained no paper. However, the stamp duties of the time allegedly applied to printing on paper or any other material. The choice of printing material also connoted an allegiance to textile workers. The newspaper urged people to revolt against national debt and the government.

Ten issues were published in total, between 3 September and 5 November 1831. Berthold claimed that, once the ink would have worn out of the tissue, readers could bring the handkerchief back so it could be printed again. At the time, selling the newspaper was illegal, and was a cause of arrest. On 28 November 1833, Henry Berthold was accused of stealing a boa and condemned to penal transportation for seven years.

Berthold died in the prison hospital at Macquarie Harbour Penal Station after serving just three years of his sentence.
