= John Francis (publisher) =

English publisher & activist (1811–1882)

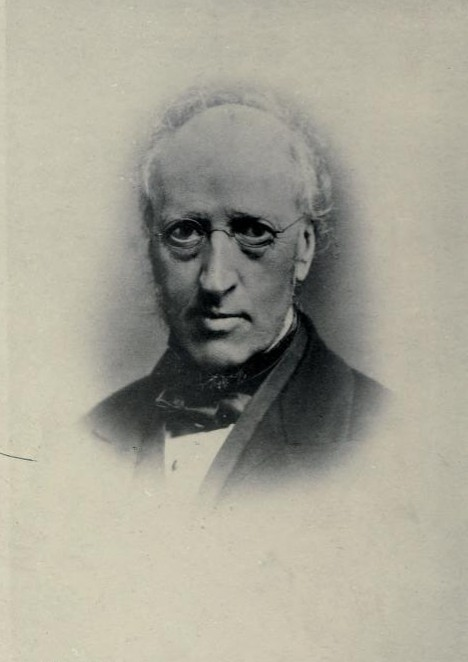
John Francis, 1881 photograph

John C. Francis (18 July 1811 – 6 April 1882) was an English publisher. He was known particularly as an activist and campaigner against the taxes on knowledge.

== Life ==
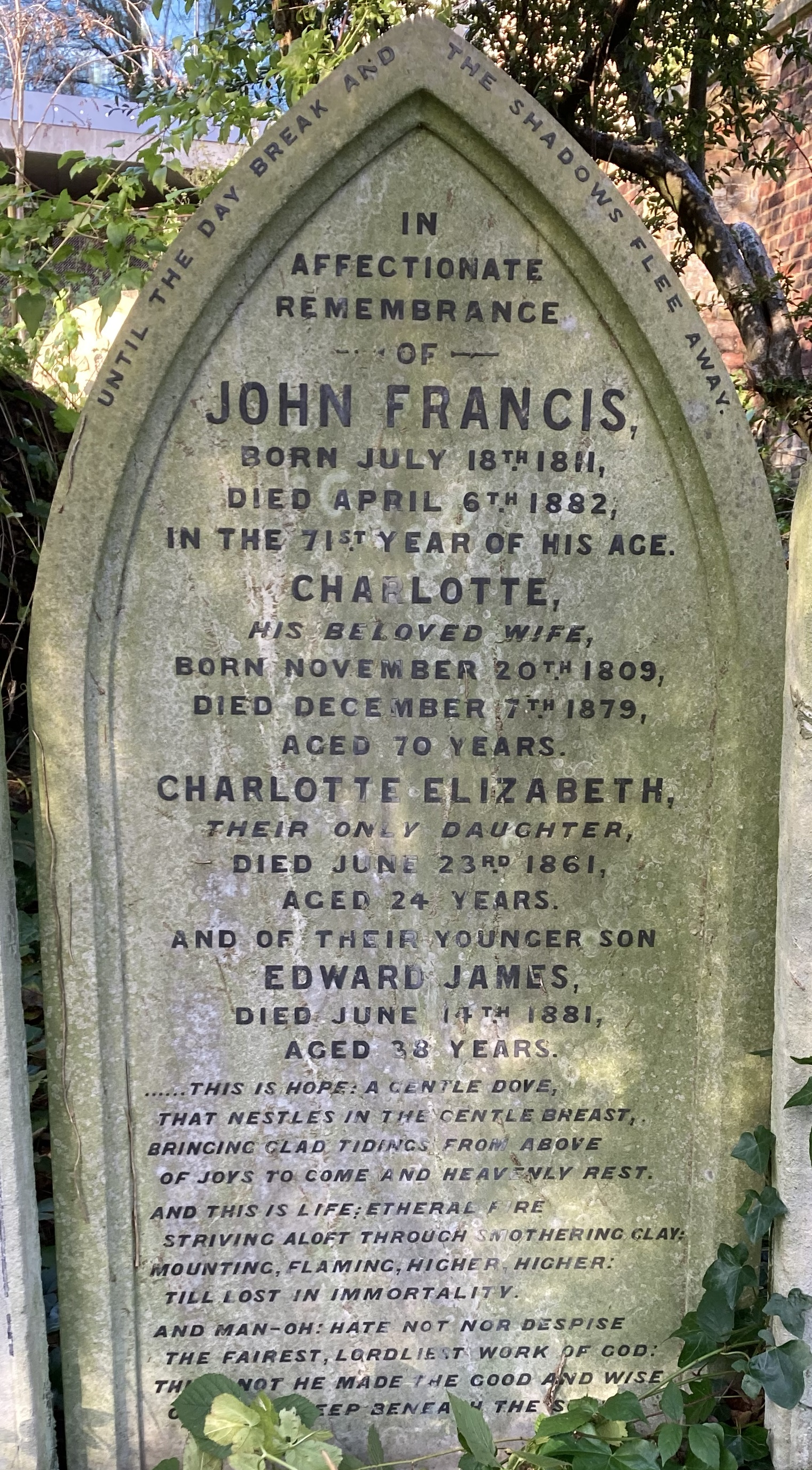
Grave of John Francis (publisher) in Highgate Cemetery

Francis was born in Bermondsey on 18 July 1811, the son of James Parker Francis (died 1850), from Saffron Walden and secretary of the Leather-dressers' Trades Union, and his wife Elizabeth, daughter of Thomas Perkins of Ware. The family was nonconformist, in the congregation of the Independent minister James Knight (c. 1769–1851) at Collier's Rents in Southwark from 1791. Francis was educated at a dame school in Long Lane, Southwark then by F. Painter in Bermondsey, and at the nonconformist school in Unicorn Yard, Tooley Street; where in 1823 he had help from John Cooper the school secretary in finding an apprenticeship with Edward Marlborough, a City of London newspaper agent at 4 Ave Maria Lane. At 14 he taught in the Sunday school of John Rippon's chapel, Carter Lane, Southwark, and was later superintendent when Rippon moved to New Park Street Chapel in 1833.

Having served his time with Marlborough, in September 1831 Francis joined the staff of the Athenæum magazine as a junior clerk; by October he was its business manager and publisher. Early in his business career he encountered the heavy fiscal restrictions on the newspaper press, and he took an active and prominent part in trying to remove these "taxes on knowledge": the advertisement duty of 1s. 6d. on each advertisement, of the stamp duty of 1d. on each newspaper, and the paper duty of 1½d. per pound, which charges were successively repealed in 1853, 1855, and 1861. During the extended campaign he took part in deputations to government ministers, and was the effective founder of the Association for the Repeal of the Paper Duty, on behalf of which he visited Edinburgh and Dublin in company with John Cassell and Henry Vizetelly. In 1863 his services were recognised, at 47 Paternoster Row, by a testimonial from the press and the Association for the Repeal of the Taxes on Knowledge.

Francis undertook the commercial affairs of Notes and Queries in 1872, in addition to his other work. In October 1881 he celebrated the fiftieth anniversary of his becoming publisher of the Athenæum.

For many years Francis resided at 2 Catherine Street, and then at 20 Wellington Street in the Strand, by his publishing offices. In 1849 he joined the new Bloomsbury Chapel under the pastorate of William Brock. Later on he lived at 11 Burghley Road, Highgate Road; but he returned in 1881 to 20 Wellington Street, he there died on 6 April 1882, and he was buried in Highgate cemetery on 18 April, near the grave of Michael Faraday, in the presence of many literary men. In his memory two John Francis pensions were founded in connection with the Newsvendors' Benevolent Institution.

== Works ==
The Bookseller of 26 April 1861 contained a paper by Francis on "The Progress of Periodical Literature from 1830 to 1860", and on 7 January 1870 he contributed to The Athenæum an essay on "The Literature of the People".

== Family ==
Francis – on October 11, 1831, in Holborn, London – married Charlotte Collins (maiden 1809–1879). His elder son, John Collins Francis (1838–1916), succeeded him as publisher of The Athenæum, and the younger son, Edward James Francis (1844–1881), was manager of the Weekly Dispatch from 1875 till his death on 14 June 1881.

== Bibliography ==
=== References ===
- Dictionary of National Biography (63 Vols.). Leslie Stephen (1832–1904), ed. London: Smith, Elder, & Co., 15 Waterloo Place. 1885–1901. LCCN 03-12075.
1. Boase, George Clement (1829–1897) (1889). Vol. 20: "Forrest – Garner" – "Francis, John (1811–1882)". pp. 168–169.
  1. Via Google Books (Stanford).
  2. Boase, George Clement (1889). "Francis, John (1811-1882)" . Dictionary of National Biography. Vol. 20. pp. 168–169.
- Oxford Dictionary of National Biography. Henry Colin Gray Matthew (1941–1999) and Brian Howard Harrison (born 1937), eds. LCCN 2008-40720; ISBN 978-0-1995-6244-2, 0-1995-6244-X (set); OCLC 257555548 (all editions).
1. Schmidt, Barbara Quinn, PhD (née R. D. Barbara Quinn; 1938–2002) (2004). Vol. 20: "Forrest – Garner" – "Francis, John (1811–1882)". pp. 739–740.
  1. Via Internet Archive (online borrow unavailable, limited preview, South San Francisco Public Library).
  2. Online ed.. doi:10.1093/ref:odnb/10075.
- Wilson, Walter (1808). The History and Antiquities of Dissenting Churches and Meeting Houses, in London, Westminster, and Southwark; Including the Lives of Their Ministers, from the Rise of Nonconformity to the Present Time – With an Appendix on the Origin, Progress, and Present State of Christianity in Britain (4 Vols.). London: Printed for the author by Richard Edwards (1768–1827).
1. Vol. 4. p. 323. Retrieved 8 August 2018.
  1. Via Google Books (Harvard).
  2. Via Google Books (Harvard).
