= Wellington Street, London =

Street in Covent Garden, London

Coordinates: 51°30′43.49″N 0°7′13.69″W

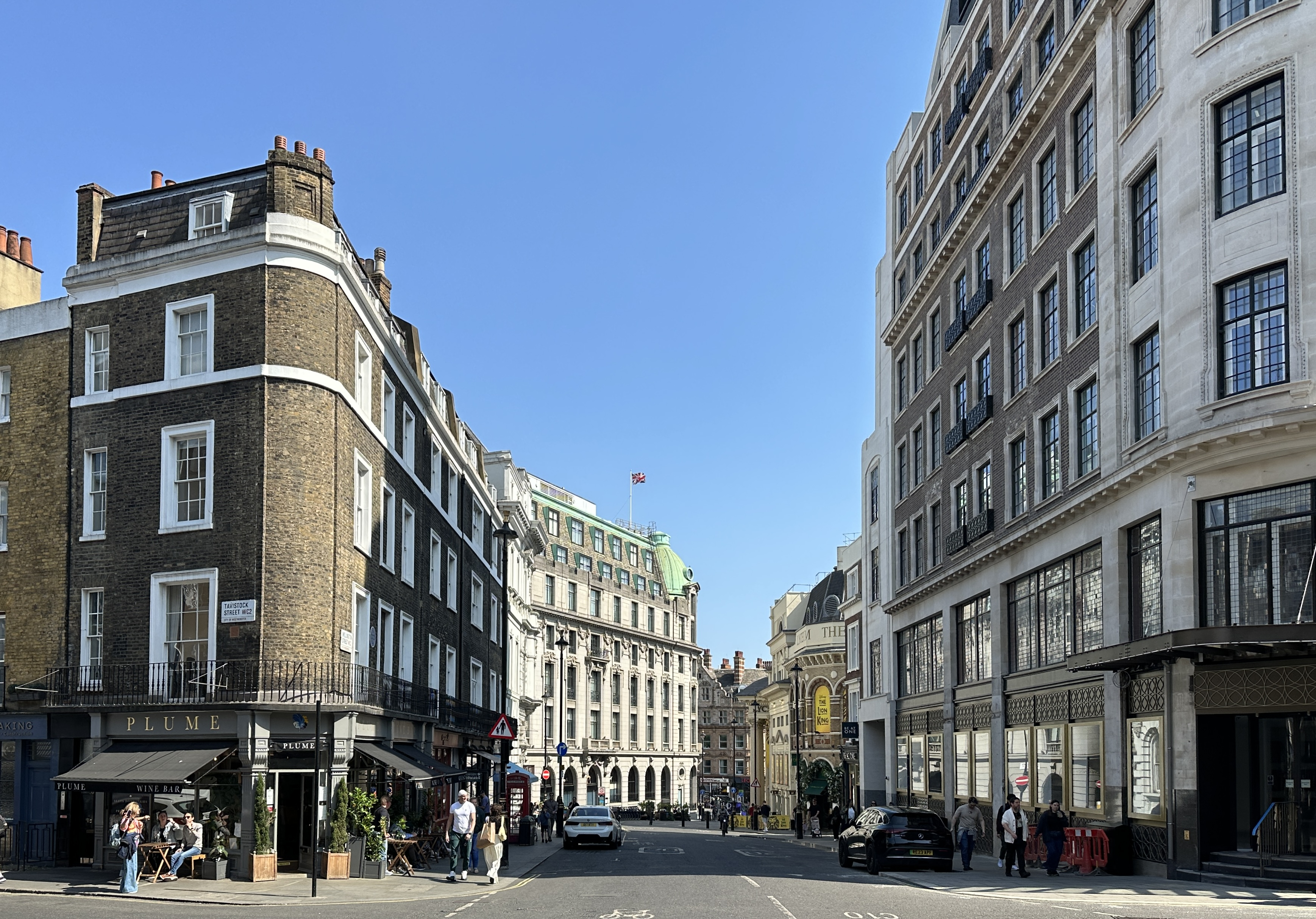
Wellington Street in 2026

Wellington Street is a street located in Covent Garden, Westminster. It connects Bow Street, Russell Street, Tavistock Street, Exeter Street, Strand and Lancaster Place. The street, first established in 1834, takes its name from Arthur Wellesley, 1st Duke of Wellington.

== History and location ==
The north-part of today's Wellington Street (between Tavistock Street and Russell Street, leading into Bow Street) is the oldest: it was built between 1631 and 1635 and named Charles Street after Charles 1. The south part (from Tavistock Street to the Strand), was developed between 1833 and 1835 over the site of the English Opera House, which had burned down in 1830 and was rebuilt in 1834 as the Lyceum Theatre. Charles Street became Upper Wellington Street in 1844. In 1859 both the name and numbering of Upper Wellington Street were assimilated to Wellington Street.

Wellington Street today runs south east to north west from Strand to Bow Street. The nearest tube station is Covent Garden.

== Buildings ==
The Lyceum Theatre is located on Wellington Street, though only its portico is original: it was restored in 1996 by G.A.R. Holohan & Associates. The theatre and many of the street's other buildings are Grade II-listed, including the block of terrace houses (Nos. 20-26), now with ground-floor shop fronts, which were designed in 1833–35 by Samuel Beazley. The Other House Covent Garden (Nos. 25-31) is a hotel incorporating a block of six properties, three of them Grade-II listed.

18 Wellington Street, on the corner of Exeter Street, was built in 1839 as Charles Frederick Bielefeld's papier-mâché works. It was originally designed by Sydney Smirke, but rebuilt in 1863–64 by Charles Octavius Parnell for the Victoria Sporting Club, a gentlemen’s gaming club. Pevsner described its style as "a very lush Victorian Baroque". From 1991 until September 2026 it housed Christopher's Restaurant. The Old Bell pub, built in 1835, is a Grade II listed public house at 16 Exeter Street and 23 Wellington Street. Penhaligon's, the perfumers (founded by William Penhaligon, moved to No. 41 Wellington Street in the 1970s.

Part of the west side between Tavistock Street and Russell Street consists of the backs of sites leased in the Piazza, originally designed as a flower market, now occupied by the London Transport Museum.

== 19th Century publishing ==
From the 1840s, the street was an important centre for publishing. Between 1843 and 1853, many newspapers and periodicals, including The Athenaeum (at No. 20, where its publisher John Francis also lived), The Critic (first at 19 Wellington Street North and later at 10 Wellington Street), The Examiner, Punch, The Spectator, The Morning Post and the serial edition of London Labour and the London Poor all had their offices on Wellington Street. The offices and private apartments of Charles Dickens (Household Words and All the Year Round) were at No. 26, where there is a blue plaque. The office of Henry Mayhew (London Poor) and G.W.M. Reynolds (Reynolds's Weekly Newspaper) were all in close proximity.

== Notable people ==
- The composers Robert King and Johann Wolfgang Franck were granted a royal licence to promote vocal and instrumental concerts, initially at the Two Golden Balls, Bow Street and (from January 1691) in Charles Street at a specially built concert hall and later auction house called The Vendu, on the west side of the street.
- Actor-manager, playwright and Poet Laureate Colley Cibber lived in the street between 1721 and 1740, while fellow actor Barton Booth lived next door to him between 1721 and 1733.
