= Probate Duty (Ireland) Act 1816 =

Act of the Parliament of the United Kingdom

Probate Duty (Ireland) Act 1816 (Note: The citation of this act by this short title was authorised by section 1 of, and the first schedule to, the Short Titles Act 1896. Due to the repeal of those provisions it is now authorised by section 19(2) of the Interpretation Act 1978.)
- Act of Parliament
- Parliament of the United Kingdom
- Long title: An Act to repeal the several Stamp Duties in Ireland, and also several Acts for the Collection and Management of the said Duties, and to grant new Stamp Duties in lieu thereof; and to make more effectual Regulations for collecting and managing the said Duties.
- Citation: 56 Geo. 3. c. 56
- Territorial extent: United Kingdom

Dates
- Royal assent: 20 June 1816
- Commencement: 5 July 1816 (Note: Section 152.)
Other legislation
Repeals/revokes	See § Repealed enactments
Amended by	Stamp Duties on Cards and Dice Act 1828; Inland Revenue Repeal Act 1870; Statute Law Revision Act 1890

Status: Amended

Text of statute as originally enacted

The Probate Duty (Ireland) Act 1816 (56 Geo. 3. c. 56) is an act of the Parliament of the United Kingdom that repealed and consolidated the law relating to stamp duties in Ireland, including the duties charged on probates of wills and letters of administration, replacing three acts of the previous year with a single revised scheme of duties and administration.

== Provisions ==
=== Repealed enactments ===
Section 1 of the act repealed 3 enactments, listed in that section, save in so far as they repealed any former act, and save as to the raising, recovering, allowing or paying, after the commencement of the act, of any arrears of duty or allowances under the repealed acts, and as to proceedings for any offence committed against those acts before the commencement of the act.

Citation	Short title	Description	Extent of repeal
55 Geo. 3. c. 78	Stamps (Ireland) Act 1815	An act to repeal the several duties under the care of the commissioners for managing the stamp duties in Ireland, and to grant new duties in lieu thereof.	The whole act.
55 Geo. 3. c. 79	Stamps (Ireland) (No. 2) Act 1815	An act to regulate the collection and management of the stamp duties on law proceedings, attorneys, solicitors, proctors, and corporate officers in Ireland.	The whole act.
55 Geo. 3. c. 81	Stamps (Ireland) (No. 4) Act 1815	An act to repeal the several acts for the collection and management of stamp duties in Ireland, and to make more effectual regulations for collecting and managing the said duties in general.	The whole act.

== Subsequent developments ==
So much of the act "as relates to the duties on playing cards and dice, to the collection and regulation of those duties, and to the exportation of cards and dice" and also "all licences granted to makers of cards or dice under the act" was repealed by section 1 of the Stamp Duties on Cards and Dice Act 1828 (9 Geo. 4. c. 18), which came into force on 5 July 1828.
