= Stamp act =

Legislation placing a tax on documents

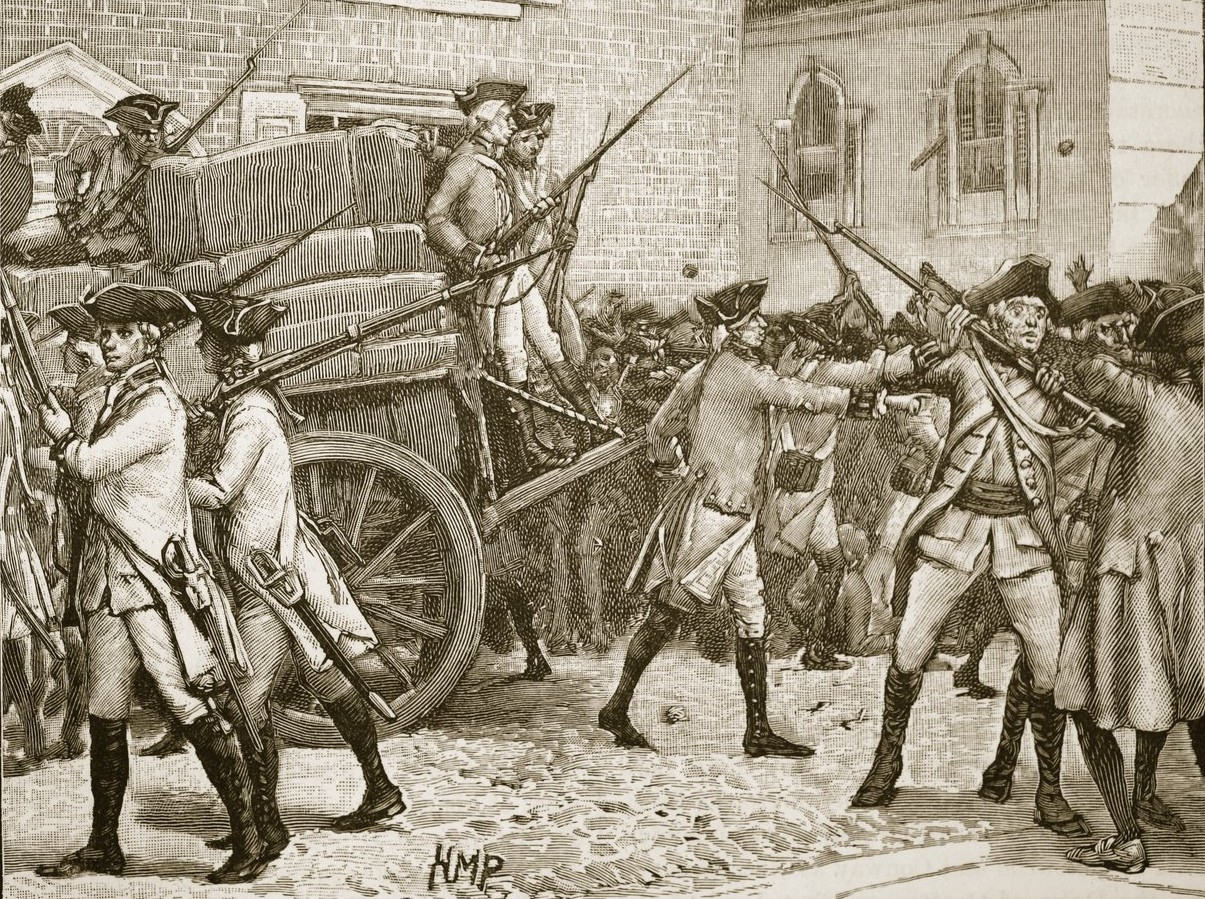
Troops escorting the stamped paper to the City Hall New York in 1766

A stamp act is any legislation that requires a tax to be paid on the transfer of certain documents. Those who pay the tax receive an official stamp on their documents, making them legal documents. A variety of products have been covered by stamp acts including playing cards, dice, patent medicines, cheques, mortgages, contracts, marriage licenses and newspapers. The items may have to be physically stamped at approved government offices following payment of the duty, although methods involving annual payment of a fixed sum or purchase of adhesive stamps are more practical and common.

This system of taxation was first devised in the Netherlands in 1624 after a public competition to find a new form of tax. Stamp acts have been enforced in many countries, including Australia, Canada, People's Republic of China, Ireland, India, Malaysia, Israel, the United Kingdom, and the United States of America.

The taxes raised under a stamp act are called stamp duty.

== Australia ==
Stamps acts were enacted in various Australian states in 1878, 1882, 1886, 1890, and 1894, with amendments from 1892 to 1907. According to these acts, stamps were required on many types of business transactions: negotiable instruments, promissory notes, bills of lading, and receipts.

In Western Australia, duties of this type were overhauled in the Western Australian Stamp Act 1921, which took effect on 1 January 2010. In South Australia, the Stamp Duties Act 1923 was first enacted in 1923, then revised or amended almost yearly until its current version of 2017.

== United Kingdom ==
=== Stamps Act 1694 ===
Stamps Act 1694
- Act of Parliament
- Parliament of England
- Long title: An Act for granting to theire Majesties severall Dutyes upon Velum Parchment and Paper for Four Yeares towards carryyng on the warr against France.
- Citation: 5 & 6 Will. & Mar. c. 21
- Territorial extent: England and Wales

Dates
- Royal assent: 25 April 1694
- Commencement: 28 June 1694 (Note: Section 1.)
- Repealed: 1 January 1871
Other legislation
| Amended by | Stamps (Amendment) Act 1694 |
| Repealed by | Inland Revenue Repeal Act 1870 |

Status: Repealed

Text of statute as originally enacted

Stamps (Amendment) Act 1694
- Act of Parliament
- Parliament of England
- Long title: An Act for explaineing and regulateing several Doubts Duties and Penalties in the late Act for granting several Duties upon Velum Parchment and Paper and for ascertaineing the Admeasurement of the Tunnage of Ships.
- Citation: 6 & 7 Will. & Mar. c. 12
- Territorial extent: England and Wales

Dates
- Royal assent: 22 April 1695
- Commencement: 7 November 1693 (Note: Start of session.)
- Repealed: 1 January 1871
Other legislation
| Amends | Stamps Act 1694 |
| Amended by | Statute Law Revision Act 1867 |
| Repealed by | Inland Revenue Repeal Act 1870 |

Status: Repealed

Text of statute as originally enacted

Stamps Act 1697
- Act of Parliament
- Parliament of England
- Long title: An Act for granting to His Majesty His Heires & Successors further Duties upon Stampt Vellum Parchment. & Paper.
- Citation: 9 Will. 3. c. 25 (Note: This is the citation in The Statutes of the Realm.); 9 & 10 Will. 3. c. 25 (Note: This is the citation in The Statutes at Large.)
- Territorial extent: England and Wales

Dates
- Royal assent: 5 July 1698
- Commencement: 1 August 1698
- Repealed: 1 January 1871
Other legislation
| Repealed by | Inland Revenue Repeal Act 1870 |
| Relates to | Stamps Act 1694; Bank of England Act 1696 |

Status: Repealed

Text of statute as originally enacted

Stamps Act 1702
- Act of Parliament
- Parliament of England
- Long title: An Act for preventing Frauds in Her Majesty's Duties upon stampt Vellum, Parchment, and Paper.
- Citation: 1 Ann. St. 2. c. 19; 1 Ann. St. 2. c. 22
- Territorial extent: England and Wales

Dates
- Royal assent: 27 February 1703
- Commencement: 25 March 1703
- Repealed: 1 January 1871
Other legislation
| Repealed by | Inland Revenue Repeal Act 1870 |

Status: Repealed

Text of statute as originally enacted

Stamps Act 1709
- Act of Parliament
- Parliament of Great Britain
- Long title: An Act for laying certain Duties upon Candles, and certain Rates upon Monies to be given with Clerks and Apprentices, towards raising Her Majesty's Supply, for the Year One Thousand Seven Hundred and Ten.
- Citation: 8 Ann. c. 5; 8 Ann. c. 9
- Territorial extent: Great Britain

Dates
- Royal assent: 24 March 1710
- Commencement: 1 May 1710
- Repealed: 1 January 1871
Other legislation
| Repealed by | Inland Revenue Repeal Act 1870 |

Status: Repealed

Text of statute as originally enacted

Stamps Act 1710
- Act of Parliament
- Parliament of Great Britain
- Long title: An Act for making good Deficiencies, and satisfying the Public Debts; and for erecting a Corporation to carry on a Trade to The South Seas; and for the Encouragement of the Fishery; and for Liberty to trade in unwrought Iron with the Subjects of Spain; and to repeal the Acts for registering Seamen.
- Citation: 9 Ann. c. 15; 9 Ann. c. 21
- Territorial extent: Great Britain

Dates
- Royal assent: 12 June 1711
- Commencement: 25 November 1710
- Repealed: 1 January 1871
Other legislation
| Amended by | Hackney Chairs Act 1712 |
| Repealed by | Inland Revenue Repeal Act 1870 |
| Relates to | Stamps (No. 2) Act 1710 |

Status: Repealed

Text of statute as originally enacted

Stamps (No. 2) Act 1710
- Act of Parliament
- Parliament of Great Britain
- Long title: An Act for licensing and regulating Hackney Coaches and Chairs; and for charging certain new Duties on Stamped Vellum, Parchment, and Paper, and on Cards and Dice, and on the Exportation of Rock Salt for Ireland; and for securing thereby, and by a Weekly Payment out of the Post-office, and by several Duties on Hides and Skins, a Yearly Fund of One Hundred Eighty-six Thousand Six Hundred and Seventy Pounds, for Thirty-two Years, to be applied to the Satisfaction of such Orders as are therein mentioned, to the Contributors of any Sum, not exceeding Two Millions, to be raised for carrying on the War, and other Her Majesty's Occasions.
- Citation: 9 Ann. c. 16; 9 Ann. c. 23
- Territorial extent: Great Britain

Dates
- Royal assent: 12 June 1711
- Commencement: 24 June 1743
- Repealed: 1 January 1871
Other legislation
| Repealed by | Inland Revenue Repeal Act 1870 |
| Relates to | Stamps Act 1710 |

Status: Repealed

Text of statute as originally enacted

A stamp duty was first introduced in England in 1694 following the Dutch model as An act for granting to Their Majesties several duties on Vellum, Parchment and Paper for four years, towards carrying on the war against France (5 & 6 Will. & Mar. c. 21). The duty ranged between 1 penny to several shillings on a number of different legal documents including insurance policies, documents used as evidence in courts, grants of honour, grants of probate and letters of administration. It raised around £50,000 a year and although it was initially a temporary measure, it proved so successful that its use was continued.

=== Stamp Act 1712 ===
Stamp Act 1712
- Act of Parliament
- Parliament of Great Britain
- Long title: An Act for altering the Stamp Duties upon Admissions into Corporations or Companies; and for further securing and improving the Stamp Duties in Great Britain.
- Citation: 10 Ann. c. 18; 10 Ann. c. 19
- Territorial extent: Great Britain

Dates
- Royal assent: 22 May 1712
- Commencement: 10 June 1712
- Repealed: 30 June 1874
Other legislation
| Amended by | Continuance of Laws, etc. Act 1742; Customs Law Repeal Act 1825; Statute Law Revision Act 1867 |
| Repealed by | Revenue Officers' Disabilities Removal Act 1874 |

Status: Repealed

Text of statute as originally enacted

Stamps Act 1713
- Act of Parliament
- Parliament of Great Britain
- Long title: An Act for laying additionall Duties on Sope and Paper, and upon certain Linnens, Silks, Calncoes, and Stuffs, and upon Starch and exported Coals, and upon stampt Vellum, Parchment, and Paper, for raising One million four hundred thousand Pounds, by way of a Lottery, for Her Majesties Supply; and for Allowances on exporting made Wares, of Leather, Sheep-skins, and Lamb-skins; and for Distribution of Four thousand Pounds, due to the Officers and Seamen for Gun-money; and to adjust the Property of Tickets in former Lotteries; and touching certain Shares of Stock in the Capital of the South Sea Company; and for appropriating the Monies granted to Her Majesty.
- Citation: 13 Ann. c. 18; 12 Ann. St. 2 c. 9
- Territorial extent: Great Britain

Dates
- Royal assent: 9 July 1714
- Commencement: 2 August 1714
- Expired: 2 August 1746
- Repealed: 1 January 1871
Other legislation
| Amended by | Duties on Soap Act 1840 |
| Repealed by | Inland Revenue Repeal Act 1870 |

Status: Repealed

Text of statute as originally enacted

The Stamp Act 1712 (10 Ann. c. 18) was an act passed in the United Kingdom on 1 August 1712 to create a new tax on publishers, particularly of newspapers. The initial assessed rate of tax was one penny per whole newspaper sheet, a halfpenny for a half sheet, and one shilling per advertisement contained within. Other than newspapers, it required that all pamphlets, legal documents, commercial bills, advertisements, and other papers be issued the tax. The act was increased in 1797 with greater taxes and wider spectrum of materials affected, reached its height around 1815 during the "taxes on knowledge" struggle, reduced in 1836, and repealed in 1855.

The stamp tax was a tax on each newspaper and thus hit cheaper papers and popular readership harder than wealthy consumers, because it formed a higher proportion of the purchase price. The act had a chilling effect on publishers; the tax is blamed for the decline of English literature critical of the government during the period, notably with The Spectator ending the same year of the tax's enactment. Its repeal in 1855 allowed a cheap press again.

=== Stamp Duties Management Act 1891 and Stamp Act 1891 ===
The above act were superseded by the Stamp Duties Management Act 1891 (54 & 55 Vict. c. 38) and the Stamp Act 1891 (54 & 55 Vict. c. 39), which still constitute the bulk of UK law on stamp duties today.

=== The modern UK Stamp Act ===
From 1914 to 1928, the Director of Stamping at the Stamp Office oversaw the production of Treasury Notes (a type of banknote, not to be confused with US Treasury notes). These were issued for denominations of £1 and 10's to enable coins to be removed from circulation and were not convertible to gold. Existing Bank of England banknotes in higher denominations continued to circulate alongside the Treasury Notes. In 1963 production of postage stamps passed to the General Post Office.

The Finance Act 1986 introduced Stamp Duty Reserve Tax. From 27 October 1986, the charge was imposed on 'closing' transactions at the London Stock Exchange which until then had been transactions where no document was used and therefore exempt from Stamp Duty.

A public display of Stamp Office artefacts and records was held at the Courtauld Institute in 1994 to commemorate the three hundredth anniversary of the introduction of UK Stamp Duty. The Stamp Office was also awarded the Charter Mark by John Major's Advisory Committee as a reward for its public service.

Stamp duties are the oldest taxes still raised by the HM Revenue and Customs.

== Israel ==
Israel used to have a stamp duty on signed documents, which was regulated by the 1961 "Stamp Tax on Documents" (Law 5731-1961), the 1965 "Stamp Tax on Documents Regulations", and subsequent Additions. The stamp duty was repealed as of 2006.

== People's Republic of China ==
As part of domestic taxation, the PRC includes a stamp tax as one of the "behavioural taxes". Foreign investors are also subject to a stamp tax. Stamp taxes in China are governed by "Provisional Regulations of the People's Republic of China Concerning Stamp Tax Detailed Rules for Its Implementation", implemented in 1988. In 1997, stamp taxes produced revenue of 26.63 billion yuan and comprised 3.6% of China's gross domestic product.

== United States ==
=== Stamp Act 1765 ===
After Great Britain was victorious over France in the Seven Years' War – which manifested in America as the French and Indian War – a small Stamp Act was enacted that covered all sorts of documents. The Stamp Act 1765 (short title Duties in American Colonies Act 1765; 5 Geo. 3. c. 12) was a direct tax imposed by the British Parliament on the colonies of British America. The act required that many printed materials in the colonies be produced on stamped paper produced in London and carrying an embossed revenue stamp. These printed materials were on every legal document, magazine, and newspaper, plus many other types of paper used throughout the colonies, including playing cards. Unlike previous taxes, the stamp tax had to be paid in valid British currency, not in colonial paper money.

The purpose of the tax was to help pay for troops stationed in North America. The British government felt that the colonies were the primary beneficiaries of this military presence, and the colonial population should pay at least a portion of the expense. The colonists claimed their constitutional rights were violated since only their own colonial legislatures could levy taxes. The colonies sent no representatives to Parliament, and therefore had no influence over what taxes were raised, how they were levied, or how they would be spent. Some opponents of the Stamp Act distinguished between "internal" taxes like the stamp duty, which they claimed Parliament had no right to impose, and revenue legitimately raised through the regulation on trade. In general, however, most colonists considered the Act to be a violation of their rights as Englishmen to be taxed without their consent – consent that only the colonial legislatures could grant because Americans were unrepresented in Parliament. The rallying cry of "No Taxation without Representation" reflected an increasingly major grievance that led to the American Revolution. The Americans saw no need for the troops or the taxes; the British saw colonial defiance of their lawful rulers.

The Stamp Act met great resistance in the colonies. Colonial assemblies sent petitions and protests. Local protest groups, led by Liberty Boys, colonial merchants and landowners, established connections through correspondence – the so-called "Committees of Correspondence" – that created a loose coalition extending from New England to Georgia. British goods were boycotted. Opposition to the tax also took the form of violence and intimidation. Custom houses and tax collectors were attacked. Protests and demonstrations initiated by the newly formed Sons of Liberty often turned violent and destructive as the masses became involved. A word used frequently by colonists was "liberty" during the Stamp Act upheaval. Opponents of the new tax staged mock funerals in which "liberty's" coffin was carried to a burial ground. They insisted that liberty could not be "taken away without consent."

A more reasoned approach was taken by some elements. James Otis, Jr. wrote the most influential protest, The Rights of the British Colonies Asserted and Proved. Otis, the radical leader in Massachusetts, convinced the Massachusetts assembly to send a circular letter to the other colonies, which called for an inter-colonial meeting to plan tempered resistance. The Stamp Act Congress convened in New York City on October 7, 1765, with nine colonies in attendance; others would likely have participated if earlier notice had been provided. The Stamp Act Congress was another step in the process of attempted common problem-solving. The Albany Congress in 1754 had been held at the urging of royal officials as a forum for voicing constitutional concerns and afforded the more conservative critics of British policy some hope of regaining control of events from the unruly mobs in the streets of many cities; in contrast, the Stamp Act Congress was strictly a colonial affair, reflecting the first significant joint colonial response to any British measure. Delegates to the Stamp Act Congress approved a fourteen-point Declaration of Rights and Grievances as a petition to the Parliament and the King, formulated largely by John Dickinson of Pennsylvania. The statement echoed the recent resolves of the Virginia House of Burgesses, which argued that colonial taxation could only be carried on by their own assemblies. The delegates singled out the Stamp Act and the use of the vice-admiralty courts for special criticism, yet ended their statement with a pledge of loyalty to the King.

Opposition to the Stamp Act was not limited to the colonies. In Canada, Nova Scotia largely ignored the Act; they allowed ships bearing unstamped papers to enter its ports, and business continued unabated after the distributors ran out of stamps. Newfoundland experienced some protests and petitions based on legislation dating back to the reign of Edward VI forbidding any sort of duties on the importation of goods related to its fisheries. The Caribbean colonies also protested. Political opposition was expressed in a number of colonies, including Barbados and Antigua, and by absentee landowners living in Britain. The worst violence took place on St. Kitts and Nevis, with rioting and blockage of stamp delivery. Montserrat and Antigua also succeeded in avoiding the use of stamps. In Jamaica there was also vocal opposition, and much evasion of the stamps. British merchants and manufacturers, whose exports to the colonies were threatened by colonial boycotts, also pressured Parliament.

The act was repealed in early 1766, although the Declaratory Act maintained Parliament's right to tax the colonies.

=== Revival ===
"Revenue stamps" were revived in the United States during the American Civil War. In 1862, the United States (Union) government began taxing a variety of goods, services, and legal dealings, in an effort to raise revenue for the great costs of the war. To confirm that taxes were paid a "revenue stamp" was purchased and appropriately affixed to the taxable item. This excise tax continued until the federal government finished paying the war debt in 1883, at which time the tax was repealed.

In 1898, revenue stamps were again issued, to provide funding for the Spanish–American War. Tax was levied on a wide range of goods and services including alcohol, tobacco, tea, and other amusements and also on various legal and business transactions such as stock certificates, bills of lading, manifests, and marine insurance. To pay these tax duties revenue tax stamps were purchased and affixed to the taxable item or respective certificate.

Revenue stamps were issued at irregular intervals for alcohol products, tobacco products, matches, proprietary medicines, and perfumes. Revenue stamps were finally discontinued on 31 December 1967.
