= Marine and Aviation Insurance (War Risks) Act 1952 =

Act of the Parliament of the United Kingdom

Marine and Aviation Insurance (War Risks) Act 1952 (Note: Section 11(1).)
- Act of Parliament
- Parliament of the United Kingdom
- Long title: An Act to make provision for authorising the Minister of Transport to undertake the insurance of ships, aircraft and certain other goods against war risks and, in certain circumstances, other risks; for the payment by him of compensation in respect of certain goods lost or damaged in transit in consequence of war risks; and for purposes connected with the matters aforesaid.
- Citation: 15 & 16 Geo. 6 & 1 Eliz. 2. c. 57
- Introduced by: Gurney Braithwaite, Parliamentary Secretary to the Ministry of Transport (Commons); Frederick Smith, 2nd Earl of Birkenhead (Lords)
- Territorial extent: United Kingdom (Note: Section 11(2).)

Dates
- Royal assent: 30 October 1952
- Commencement: 30 October 1952 (Note: The Acts of Parliament (Commencement) Act 1793.)
Other legislation
Amends	Stamp Act 1891; Marine Insurance Act 1906; War Risks Insurance Act 1939; Restriction of Advertisement (War Risks Insurance) Act 1939; Defence (War Risks Insurance) Regulations 1940
Amended by	Finance Act 1959; Statute Law Revision Act 1963; National Loans Act 1968; Transfer of Functions (Sea Transport, etc.) Order 1968; Finance Act 1970; Statute Law (Repeals) Act 1974; Statute Law (Repeals) Act 1981

Status: Partially repealed

Text of statute as originally enacted

Revised text of statute as amended

Text of the Marine and Aviation Insurance (War Risks) Act 1952 as in force today (including any amendments) within the United Kingdom, from legislation.gov.uk.

The Marine and Aviation Insurance (War Risks) Act 1952 (15 & 16 Geo. 6 & 1 Eliz. 2. c. 57) is an act of the Parliament of the United Kingdom.

The act allows the Secretary of State for Transport to insure and re-insure aircraft and cargoes against war risks and in certain circumstances other risks, using a Department for Transport fund. This enables the Government of the United Kingdom to provide war risk insurance cover in emergency circumstances, which might not otherwise be available except at prohibitive premium rates. This, in turn, ensures that should hostilities occur, or even on the threat of hostilities, ships and aeroplanes will not be held up, or the trade of the country interfered with, due to lack of insurance.

== Subsequent developments ==
Section 11(3) of, and the schedule to, the act were repealed by section 1 of, and part XI of the schedule to, the Statute Law (Repeals) Act 1974, which came into force on 27 June 1974.
