= Stamps (No. 3) Act 1803 =

Act of the Parliament of the United Kingdom

- Act of Parliament
- Parliament of the United Kingdom
- Long title: An Act for consolidating the Duties on stamped Vellum, Parchment and Paper, in Great Britain.
- Citation: 43 Geo. 3. c. 127
- Territorial extent: United Kingdom

Dates
- Royal assent: 11 August 1803
- Commencement: 11 August 1803 (Note: The Acts of Parliament (Commencement) Act 1793.)
- Repealed: 1 January 1871

Other legislation
- Repealed by: Inland Revenue Repeal Act 1870

Status: Repealed

Text of statute as originally enacted

The Stamps (No. 3) Act 1803 (43 Geo. 3. c. 127) was an act of the Parliament of the United Kingdom that consolidated the duties on stamped vellum, parchment, and paper in Great Britain.

== Subsequent developments ==
The whole act was repealed by section 2 of, and the schedule to, the Inland Revenue Repeal Act 1870 (33 & 34 Vict. c. 99), which came into operation on 1 January 1871.
