= Duties on Soap Act 1840 =

Act of the Parliament of the United Kingdom

- Act of Parliament
- Parliament of the United Kingdom
- Long title: An Act to consolidate and amend the Laws for collecting the Duties of Excise on Soap made in Great Britain.
- Citation: 3 & 4 Vict. c. 49
- Territorial extent: United Kingdom

Dates
- Royal assent: 4 August 1840
- Commencement: 27 July 1840 (Note: Section 73.)
- Repealed: 6 August 1861
Other legislation
| Amends | See § Repealed enactments |
| Repeals/revokes | See § Repealed enactments |
| Repealed by | Statute Law Revision Act 1861 |

Status: Repealed

Text of statute as originally enacted

The Duties on Soap Act 1840 (3 & 4 Vict. c. 49) was an act of the Parliament of the United Kingdom.

== Provisions ==
=== Repealed enactments ===
Section 69 of the act repealed 17 enactments, listed in that section.

| Citation | Short title | Description | Extent of repeal |
|---|---|---|---|
| 10 Ann. c. 18 (Note: This is the citation in The Statutes of the Realm.) | Taxation Act 1711 | An Act passed in the Tenth Year of the Reign of HerMajesty QueenAnne, intituled An Act for laying several Duties upon all Sope and Paper made in Great Britain or imported into the same, and upon chequered and striped Linens imported, and upon certain Silks, Calicoes, Linens, and Stuff's printed, painted, or stained, and upon several Kinds of stampt Vellum, Parchment, and Paper, and upon certain printed Papers, Pamphlets, and Advertisements ; for raising the Sum of Eighteen hundred thousand Pounds by way of Lottery towards Her Majesty's Supply; and for licensing an additional Number of Hackney Chairs ; and for charging certain Stocks of Cards and Dice; and for better securing Her Majesty's Duties to arise in the Office of the Stamp Duties by Licences for Marriages and otherwise; and for Relief of Persons who have not claimed their Lottery Tickets in due Time, or have lost Exchequer Bills or Lottery Tickets ; and for borrowing Money upon Stock, Part of the Capital of the South Sea Company, for the Use of the Publick. | So far as the same relate to Duties and Drawbacks of Excise on Soap, or contain any Regulations for collecting, managing, or securing, or paying the Duties and Drawbacks on Soap. |
| 13 Ann. c. 1 | Stamps Act 1713 | An Act passed in the Twelfth Year of the Reign of Her Majesty Queen Anne, intituled An Act for laying additional Duties on Sope and Paper, and upon certain Linens, Silks, Callicoes, and Stuffs, and upon Starch, and exported Coals, and upon stampt Vellum, Parchment, and Paper; for raising One million four hundred thousand Pounds by way of Lottery for Her Majesty's Supply ; and forAllowances on exporting made Wares of Leather, Sheep Skins and Lamb Skins; and for Distribution of Four thousand Pounds due to the Officers and Seamen for Gun Money; and to adjust the Property of Tickets in former Lotteries; and touching certain Shares of Stock in the Capital of the South Sea Company, and for appropriating the Monies granted to Her Majesty. | So far as the same relate to Duties and Drawbacks of Excise on Soap, or contain any Regulations for collecting, managing, or securing, or paying the Duties and Drawbacks on Soap. |
| 1 Geo. 1. St. 2. c. 36 | Taxation, etc. Act 1715 | An Act passed in the First Year of the Reign of His Majesty King George the First, intituled An Act for charging and continuing the Duties on Malt, Mum, Cyder, and Perry, for the Service of the Year One thousand seven hundred and sixteen; and for compelling several Receivers to finish and clear their Accounts; and for making Duplicates of Exchequer Bills, Lottery Tickets and Orders lost, burnt, or destroyed, and for enlarging the Time for adjusting Claims to certain Benefit Tickets; and for allowing the Charge of executing the Lottery Act for the Service of the Year One thousand seven hundred and ten, and for recovering Monies of several Land Taxes resting in the Hands of Collectors or Constables at Saint Alban's; and for preventing Frauds in the Duties upon Sope; and for limiting a Time for Persons who have certain Annuities for Life or Lives to demand the Payments thereupon at the Exchequer; and for preventing Frauds in the Duties relating to printed and painted Paper, Calicoes, and other Things therein mentioned. | So far as the same relate to Duties and Drawbacks of Excise on Soap, or contain any Regulations for collecting, managing, or securing, or paying the Duties and Drawbacks on Soap. |
| 11 Geo. 1. c. 30 | Adulteration of Tea and Coffee Act 1724 | An Act passed in the Eleventh Year of the Reign of His said Majesty King George the First, intituled An Act for more effectual preventing Frauds and Abuses in the Publick Revenues ; for preventing Frauds in the Salt Duties, and for giving Relieffor Salt used in the Curing of Salmon and CodFish, in the Year One thousand seven hundred and nineteen, exported from that Part of Great Britain called Scotland; for enabling the Insurance Companies to plead the General Issue in Actions brought against them, and for securing the Stamp Duties upon Policies of Insurance. | So far as the same relate to Duties and Drawbacks of Excise on Soap, or contain any Regulations for collecting, managing, or securing, or paying the Duties and Drawbacks on Soap. |
| 5 Geo. 3. c. 43 | Customs, etc., Revenues Act 1765 | An Act passed in the Fifth Year of the Reign of His Majesty King George the Third, intituledAn Act for the better securing and further Improvement of the Revenues of Customs, Excise, Inland and Salt Duties, and for encouraging the Linen Manufacture of the Isle of Man, and for allowing the Importation of several Goods, the Produce and Manufacture of the said Island, under certain Restrictions and Regulations. | So far as the same relate to Duties and Drawbacks of Excise on Soap, or contain any Regulations for collecting, managing, or securing, or paying the Duties and Drawbacks on Soap. |
| 12 Geo. 3. c. 46 | Excise Act 1772 | An Act passed in the Twelfth Year of the Reign of His said Majesty King George the Third, intituled An Act for the more effectual preenting of Frauds in the Revenues of Excise with respect to Tea, Soap, Low Wines, and Spirits. | So far as the same relate to Duties and Drawbacks of Excise on Soap, or contain any Regulations for collecting, managing, or securing, or paying the Duties and Drawbacks on Soap. |
| 14 Geo. 3. c. 73 | Distillation, etc. Act 1774 | An Act passed in the Fourteenth Year of the Reign of His said Majesty King George the Third, intituled An Act to extend so much of an Act passed in the Twelfth Year of the Reign of His present Majesty as relates to Distillers or Makers of Low Wines and Spirits from Corn to every Kind of Distiller, and for the more effectual securing the Revenue of Excise arising from Low Wines and Spirits ; and for ascertaining the Allowance to be made to the Manufacturers of Wool and Linen in respect of the Duties on Soap imported and used in the Woollen and Linen Manufactures. | So far as the same relate to Duties and Drawbacks of Excise on Soap, or contain any Regulations for collecting, managing, or securing, or paying the Duties and Drawbacks on Soap. |
| 17 Geo. 3. c. 52 | Duties on Soap, etc. Act 1776 | An Act passed in the Seventeenth Year of the Reign of His said Majesty King George the Third, intituled An Act for better securing the Duties on Sope, and the Duties on Rum of the Sugar Plantations put into Warehouses, and for allowing a Drawback of the Duties on Rum shipped as Stores to be consumed on board Merchants Ships on their Voyages, for a limited Time. | So far as the same relate to Duties and Drawbacks of Excise on Soap, or contain any Regulations for collecting, managing, or securing, or paying the Duties and Drawbacks on Soap. |
| 24 Geo. 3. Sess. 2. c. 48 | Duties on Starch and Soap Act 1784 | An Act passed in the Twenty-fourth Year of the Reign of His said Majesty George the Third, intituled An Act for better securing the Duties on Starch and Sope. | So far as the same relate to Duties and Drawbacks of Excise on Soap, or contain any Regulations for collecting, managing, or securing, or paying the Duties and Drawbacks on Soap. |
| 26 Geo. 3. c. 77 | Excise (No. 5) Act 1786 | An Act passed in the Twenty-sixth Year of the Reign of His said Majesty George the Third, intituled An Act to limit a Time for the Repayment of the Duties on Male Servants and Carriages by the Commissioners of Excise, and also on Horses, Waggons, Wains, and Carts, by the Commissioners of Stamps, and for the Amendment of several Laws relating to the Duties under the Management of the Commissioners of Excise. | So far as the same relate to Duties and Drawbacks of Excise on Soap, or contain any Regulations for collecting, managing, or securing, or paying the Duties and Drawbacks on Soap. |
| 27 Geo. 3. c. 31 | Exports Act 1787 | An Act passed in the Twenty-seventh Year of the Reign of His said Majesty King George the Third, intituled An Act for making Allowances to the Dealers in Foreign Wines for the Stock of certain Foreign Wines in their Possession at a certain Time, upon which the Duties on Importation have been paid, and for amending several Laws relative to the Revenue of Excise. | So far as the same relate to Duties and Drawbacks of Excise on Soap, or contain any Regulations for collecting, managing, or securing, or paying the Duties and Drawbacks on Soap. |
| 28 Geo. 3. c. 37 | Excise Act 1788 | An Act passed in the Twenty-eighth Year of the Reign of His said Majesty King George the Third, intituled An Act for repealing the Duties on Buck or Deer Skins, undressed Buck or Deer Skins, Indianhalf-dressed and Elk Skins undressed imported, and on Hides and Skins dressed in Oil in this Kingdom, and for granting other Duties in lieu thereof; for laying a Duty on Stuff's painted, stained, or dyed in Great Britain, allowing Deer and other Skins, the Produce of Florida, to be sold by Auction free from the Duty charged on such Sales ; for amending several Laws relative to the Revenue of Excise, and to prevent the Sale of Sweets for Consumption in the Houses of Retailers thereof who shall not have Licences to sell Beer or Ale. | So far as the same relate to Duties and Drawbacks of Excise on Soap, or contain any Regulations for collecting, managing, or securing, or paying the Duties and Drawbacks on Soap. |
| 32 Geo. 3. c. 21 | Frauds in Excise Revenue (No. 2) Act 1792 | An Act passed in the Thirty-second Year of the Reign of His said Majesty King George the Third, intituled An Act for the more effectual Prevention of Frauds in the Revenue of Excise with respect to the manufacturing of Soap. | The whole act. |
| 47 Geo. 3. Sess. 2 | Excise, etc. (Great Britain) Act 1807 | An Act passed in the Forty-seventh Year of the Reign of His said Majesty King George the Third, intituled An Act to amend several Laws of Excise in Great Britain relating to the Duties on Salt, Sope, Paper, Coffee, Cocoa Nuts, Spirits, and Glass, and for restoring Seizures in certain Cases. | So far as the same relate to Duties and Drawbacks of Excise on Soap, or contain any Regulations for collecting, managing, or securing, or paying the Duties and Drawbacks on Soap. |
| 59 Geo. 3. c. 90 | Duties on Soap, etc. (Great Britain) Act 1819 | An Act passed in the Fifty-ninth Year of the Reign of His said Majesty King George the Third, intituled An Act for the Prevention of Frauds in the Duties on Soap; for preserving the Books or Papers called Specimens left by the Officers of Excise on the Premises of Traders, and for requiring more speedy Payment of the Excise Duties on Printed Calicoes. | So far as the same relate to Duties and Drawbacks of Excise on Soap, or contain any Regulations for collecting, managing, or securing, or paying the Duties and Drawbacks on Soap. |
| | | An Act passed in the Third Year of the Reign of His lateMajesty King William the Fourth, intituled An Act to repeal the Duties, Allowances, and Drawbacks of Excise on Soap, and to grant other Duties, Allowances, and Drawbacks in lieu thereof. | Except somuch of the said Act as grants and allows the Allowances onSoap used, employed, or consumed in Manufactures, and as enacts that no such Allowances shall be claimed by, or be paid or payable to any Servant or Workman, or Person other than the Owner, or One of the Part Owners, or the Foreman of the Manufactory or Business in which the Soap in respect of which such Allowance shall be claimed shall have been used or consumed. |
| 2 & 3 Vict. c. 63 | Duties on Soap Act 1839 | An Act passed in the Third Year of the Reign of Her present Majesty, intituled AnAct to remove Doubts as to the charging the Duty of Excise on Hard Soap until the Eleventh Day of October One thousand eight hundred and forty. | The whole act. |

== Subsequent developments ==
The whole act was repealed by section 1 of, and the schedule to, the Statute Law Revision Act 1861 (24 & 25 Vict. c. 101), which came into force on 6 August 1861.
