= Stamp duty in the United Kingdom =

Tax charged on legal instruments

Stamp duty in the United Kingdom is a form of tax charged on legal instruments (written documents), which historically required a physical stamp to be attached to or impressed upon the document in question. The more modern versions of the tax no longer require a physical stamp.

== History of UK stamp duties ==
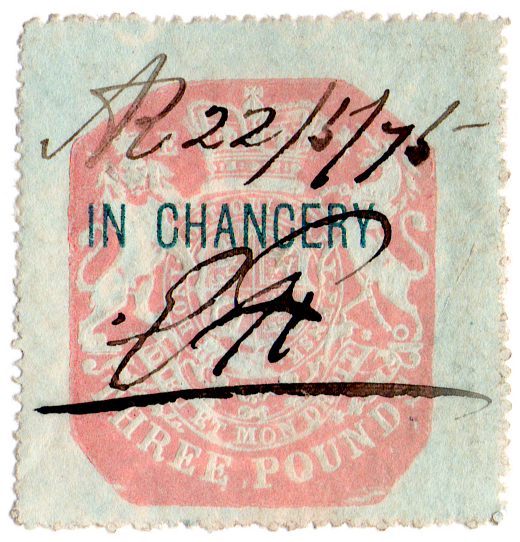
An 1875 £3 chancery revenue stamp of the United Kingdom

Stamp duty was first introduced in England on 28 June 1694, during the reign of William III and Mary II, under "An act for granting to their Majesties several duties upon vellum, parchment and paper, for four years, towards carrying on the war against France". In the 1702/03 financial year 3,932,933 stamps were embossed in England for a total value of £91,206.10s.4d. Stamp duty was so successful that it continues to this day through a series of Stamp Acts. Similar duties have been levied in the Netherlands, France and elsewhere.

During the 18th and early 19th centuries, stamp duties were extended to cover newspapers, pamphlets, lottery tickets, apprentices' indentures, advertisements, playing cards, dice, hats, gloves, patent medicines, perfumes, insurance policies, gold and silver plate, hair powder and armorial bearings.

The attempted enforcement of the Stamp Act 1765 in the British colonies in America led to the outcry of "no taxation without representation". The argument over stamp duty contributed to the outbreak of the American War of Independence.

Until 1793 stamp duty was always imposed as a fixed amount, regardless of the size of the transaction. In 1808 stamp duty on conveyances of sale, including transfers of land and shares, became an ad valorem tax.

Historically, stamp taxes were administered by the Board of Stamps. This merged with the Board of Taxes in 1833/34, and the Board of Inland Revenue was created under the Inland Revenue Board Act 1849 by merger of the Board of Excise and Board of Stamps and Taxes. Stamp taxes were then administered by the Inland Revenue Stamp Taxes business stream (formerly the Stamp Office). Another merger occurred in 2004, when the Inland Revenue and HM Customs & Excise formed HM Revenue & Customs which now itself manages stamp duty.

The Stamp Duties Management Act 1891 and the Stamp Act 1891 still contain much of the operative law on stamp duties, although there have since been significant amendments and a partial consolidation was made in the Finance Act 1999. The Stamp Act 1891 was the inspiration for many of the older Australian stamp duty Acts.

Between 1782 and 1971, a tax was charged on cheques in the United Kingdom. The charge was one penny until 1918, when Chancellor of the Exchequer Bonar Law raised it to twopence. The tax was abolished shortly before decimalisation.

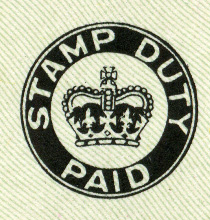
The "Stamp Duty Paid" mark that appeared on British cheques from 1956 to 1971

=== List of items subject to stamp duty ===
The Stamps Act 1694 imposed stamp duty on a range of legal instruments. During the early part of the eighteenth century, the duty was extended to cover a number of other paper items (plus dice, which were stamped on their packaging) including the following:

- Playing cards (1711–1960, became excise duty from 1864 onwards)
- Dice (1711–1862)
- Almanacks (1711–1834)
- Advertisements (1712–1853)
- Newspapers (1712–1855)

Later, because of the perceived efficiency of stamp duty as a means of raising revenue, stamp duty was levied on a variety of items, whether or not paper-based, including:

- Patent medicines (1783–1941)
- Gold and silver plate (1783–1890), and licences for dealing therein
- Hats (1784–1811)
- Game certificates (1784–2007, became assessed tax from 1808 and excise licence from 1860)
- Gloves and mittens (1785–1794)
- Attorneys' and solicitors' licences (1785–1949)
- Pawnbrokers' licences (1785–1974, became excise licence from 1864)
- Hair powder (1786–1800)
- Perfumes and cosmetics (1786–1800)
- Receipts (1795)
- Paper (1795)
- Admission to Entertainment venues like cinemas and circuses (1916-1960), under the Finance (New Duties) Act 1916

== Current scope ==
The scope of stamp duty has been reduced dramatically in recent years. Apart from transfers of shares and securities, the issue of bearer instruments and certain transactions involving partnerships, stamp duty was largely abolished in the UK from 1 December 2003. "Stamp duty land tax" (SDLT), a new transfer tax derived from stamp duty, was introduced for land transactions from 1 December 2003. "Stamp duty reserve tax" (SDRT) was introduced on agreements to transfer uncertificated shares and other securities in 1986, and with the growth of paperless transactions SDRT rather than stamp duty now applies to most transfers of shares and securities. Stamp duty land tax on transactions was replaced in Scotland by the new Land and Buildings Transaction Tax (LBTT) from 1 April 2015 and replaced in Wales by Land Transaction Tax on 1 April 2018.

Physical stamping of documents for stamp duty was retired on 19 July 2021, having been replaced by an electronic system.

== Stamp duty reserve tax ==
Aside from an exemption for 'qualifying intermediaries' such as market makers at large banks, Stamp duty reserve tax (SDRT) was introduced under the Finance Act 1986 to ensure that a form of tax equivalent to stamp duty would continue to be payable on the transfer of uncertificated shares. At that time, it was expected that the TAURUS share trading system would come into operation. In the event, SDRT was adapted for the change to trading in uncertificated shares in CREST, and is charged on agreements to transfer shares and other securities. SDRT is not a stamp tax, but a self-assessed transfer tax which is usually collected automatically by stock market participants (such as brokers) when a transaction takes place.

Stamp duty remains in force for shares and securities that are held in certificated form which can only be transferred by using a physical stock transfer form, and runs in parallel to SDRT on agreements to transfer shares. Since 1986, both stamp duty and SDRT have been charged at a rate of 0.5% of the consideration for the transfer of shares (in the case of stamp duty, rounded up to the nearest £5). The same transaction may include an agreement to transfer shares which may trigger a liability to SDRT, and the agreement may later be completed by a transfer of the shares which is liable to stamp duty. Provided that the transfer is stamped within 6 years, the charge to SDRT is cancelled to avoid a double charge. Stamp duty on repurchases of shares with a value of less than £1,000 was abolished from 13 March 2008.

A higher rate of SDRT at 1.5% is charged for the issue or transfer of shares to a person who operates a depositary receipt scheme or a clearance service (other than CREST, which is exempted). The higher charge compensates for the fact that later transfers of depositary interests or through the clearance services will not attract SDRT. This type of SDRT is by nature paid almost exclusively by offshore (i.e. non-UK) investors, primarily US fund managers and amounts to approx. 25% of the total SDRT collected annually.

Over several years after its July 2000 acquisition of CCF, HSBC and its custodians mounted lawsuits against HMRC alleging that the levying of the 1.5% SDRT charge on delivery of HSBC shares into Euroclear as consideration for the acquisition of CCF shares breached EEC Directive 69/335/EEC on capital taxes. Ultimately HSBC won, with the 1.5% SDRT charge prohibited for any delivery (definitely pre-Brexit, and apparently post Brexit also) into an EU clearance system, and the initial delivery of newly issued shares into any clearance system worldwide. HMRC was obliged to refund SDRT improperly levied.

A unique feature of SDRT, compared to other purely domestic taxes in the United Kingdom, is that more than 40% of the annual intake is collected from outside the UK, thus creating an annual inflow of approx. £1.5 billion from foreign investors to the UK government.

== Stamp duty land tax ==
Graphs of residential stamp duty land tax and rates for individuals for before and after 4 December 2014

Stamp duty land tax (SDLT) is a tax on land transactions in England and Northern Ireland. It was introduced by the Finance Act 2003. It largely replaced stamp duty with effect from 1 December 2003. SDLT is not a stamp duty, but a form of self-assessed transfer tax charged on "land transactions".

In Scotland, a Land and Buildings Transaction Tax was introduced from 1 April 2015, replacing SDLT.

In Wales, Land Transaction Tax replaced stamp duty in 2018.

For typical transactions in land, such as the buying and selling of a residential house, there is little change from stamp duty, except that a tax return is required to be made to the HM Revenue and Customs (previously Inland Revenue) and documents no longer need be given a physical stamp. Like any other self-assessed tax, but unlike stamp duty, HM Revenue and Customs is able to enquire into an SDLT return and raise assessments to recover unpaid SDLT.

When a return is accepted by HMRC they provide a certificate without which it is impossible to register a change in the land ownership. Even though the HMRC website itself says that SDLT is due within 14 days of the transaction completing, mortgage lenders may require that the Stamp Duty is paid upon completion itself. Stamp duty is typically paid by the conveyancer or solicitor directly to HMRC.

SDLT is charged on leasehold transactions as well as freehold. SDLT is also charged on the ground rent payable under the lease, at the rate of 1% of the (discounted) net present value of rent passing under the whole term of the lease. Previously, stamp duty was charged at rate of up to 24% of the annual rent. The amount of SDLT due on the grant of a typical commercial lease generally amounts to a substantial increase from the amount of stamp duty that would have been due previously.

HMRC data for April 2025 to January 2026 showed cumulative Stamp Taxes receipts of £17.0 billion, £1.9 billion higher than the same period in the previous year, reflecting continued property transaction activity despite higher rates on additional dwellings.

=== Changes to SDLT ===
In 2005, the threshold for paying SDLT was raised from £60,000 to £120,000. In 2006, the threshold was further raised to £125,000. In certain disadvantaged areas, the threshold is raised to £150,000. In 2007, at the Conservative Party Conference in Blackpool, George Osborne, then shadow chancellor, announced that a Conservative government would abolish stamp duty for first-time buyers on properties up to £250,000. This was introduced as a two-year measure by Labour in 2010, just before the 2010 general election. The removal of the "slab" structure in 2014 meant that all purchases under the threshold were tax free, regardless of the status of the buyer.

On 2 September 2008, the UK Government announced that the threshold for paying SDLT would be raised from £125k to £175k for one year, as from 3 September 2008. In the 2009 Budget, the Chancellor extended this "stamp duty holiday" until the end of 2009.

In the 2010 budget, the chancellor ended stamp duty on homes under £250,000 for first-time buyers for a two-year period, while introducing a new 5% rate for properties over £1,000,000. In the budget of 2012, Chancellor George Osborne introduced a new 7% level for properties over £2,000,000 to assuage Liberal Democrat demands for a mansion tax. Some research has indicated this tax, at the lower end of the housing market, might depress mobility and lead to inefficient allocation of housing.

In the 2014 Autumn Statement, chancellor George Osborne announced reform to stamp duty to remove the slab element – stamp duty is now paid on the amount above certain thresholds rather than one rate on the total amount which depends on the amount, as detailed in the section above. This change was beneficial for 98% of property purchases but caused a collapse in sales at the upper end of the market.

In the 2015 Autumn Statement, chancellor George Osborne announced further reforms to stamp duty. With effect from April 2016, buyers of second homes (whether Buy to let or holiday homes) pay a 3% surcharge on top of the standard rate for any particular price. This is refunded if the first home is sold within three years.

A stamp duty holiday was introduced from 8 July 2020 until 30 June 2021 and from 1 July 2021 to 30 September 2021 offering reduced rates on purchases.

A permanent return to the rates that were in place between 1 July and 30 September 2021 was announced with immediate effect at the mini-budget on 23 September 2022. At the Autumn Statement in November 2022 the incoming chancellor, Jeremy Hunt, made the September 2022 reductions time-limited, to end on 31 March 2025. Separately, from 1 April 2021 a 2% surcharge has applied to purchases by non-UK residents, and at the October 2024 Budget the additional-dwellings surcharge was raised from 3% to 5% with effect from 31 October 2024. On 1 April 2025 the nil-rate threshold reverted from £250,000 to £125,000, and first-time buyers' relief returned to a £300,000 nil-rate band on purchases up to £500,000.

=== Criticism of SDLT ===
Prior to the 2014 change, the National Association of Estate Agents and the Association of Residential Letting Agents said that SDLT distorted or depressed the housing market due to the sharp increases above certain thresholds (sometimes known as the "slab" system). Campaigners like the Taxpayers Alliance and Stamp Duty Reform UK, argued for a progressive tax based on incremental tax bands. In November 2013 the Council of Mortgage Lenders produced a detailed report calling for reform.

The changes made in the 2014 Autumn Statement caused a collapse in the number of sales of more expensive properties.

In October 2015 the Spatial Economics Research Centre produced a report detailing the distorting effects of stamp duty on the housing market.

=== Tax revenue ===
In years prior to 2005, there had been a high level of house price inflation in the UK but no change in these thresholds, leading to a substantial increase in the revenue from SDLT through bracket creep. In 2000–01, the Inland Revenue received £2.145bn from residential stamp duty. In 2002–03, it received £3.59bn, rising to £6.5bn in 2007-8

Revenue from the tax peaked in 2022–2023 at £15.36 billion, however it has since declined.

=== Tax rates ===
==== Current tax rates ====
For residential purchases in England and Northern Ireland the rates from 1 April 2025 are as follows:

Consideration	Rate (paid on portion in band)	With additional-dwellings surcharge
up to £125,000	0%	5%
£125,001 to £250,000	2%	7%
£250,001 to £925,000	5%	10%
£925,001 to £1,500,000	10%	15%
over £1,500,000	12%	17%

The surcharge applies to purchases of additional dwellings - e.g. second homes, buy-to-let and company purchases - of £40,000 or more. Non-UK resident purchasers pay a further 2% on each band, and companies buying dwellings for more than £500,000 pay a single rate of 17% unless a relief applies.

From 23 September 2022 until 31 March 2025 the rates were:

Consideration	Rate (paid on portion in band)	Including additional property surcharge
from £40,000 to £250,000	0%	3%
from £250,001 to £925,000	5%	8%
from £925,001 to £1,500,000	10%	13%
over £1,500,000	12%	15%

The additional-property surcharge within this period was increased from 3% to 5% on 31 October 2024.

As part of the response to the COVID-19 pandemic, the 2020 Summer Statement introduced a temporary reduction in stamp duty for buyers in England and Northern Ireland completing purchases before 31 March 2021 with no stamp duty due on the first £500,000 of property value. This was implemented into law through the Stamp Duty Land Tax (Temporary Relief) Act 2020. In the March 2021 United Kingdom budget the deadline was extended to 30 June 2021 for purchases up to £500,000 and 30 September 2021 for purchases up to £125,000.

Despite a reversion of rates on 1 October 2021 a permanent reduction to the rates in place during the second period of the stamp duty holiday took effect on 23 September 2022.

==== First time buyers ====
First time buyers can claim a relief.

From 23 September 2022 until the 1 April 2025, the stamp duty bands were:

- 0% on purchases up to £425,000
- 5% on the portion between £425,001 and £625,000

For purchases above £625,001 the same rules apply as for those who have purchased a home before.

Starting from 1 April 2025, thresholds for each band were reduced:

- 0% on purchases up to £300,000
- 5% on the portion between £300,001 and £500,000

For purchases above £500,001 the same rules apply as for those who have purchased a home before.

The government defines first-time buyers as “an individual or individuals who have never owned an interest in a residential property in the United Kingdom or anywhere else in the world and who intends to occupy the property as their main residence”.

==== Tax rates prior to December 2014 ====
Prior to 4 December 2014 the rates were as follows:

Consideration	Rate (paid on total value)
up to £125,000	0%
from £125,001 to £250,000	1%
from £250,001 to £500,000	3%
from £500,001 to £1,000,000	4%
from £1,000,001 to £2,000,000	5%
over £2,000,000	7% (bought by individuals); 15% (bought by corporations)

At this time, SDLT worked on a "slab" basis, so the above percentages apply to the whole of the purchase price. For example, a house priced at £250,000 would attract an SDLT of £2,500, but one of £250,001 would be liable to SDLT of £7,500, while one of £500,000 would be liable for £15,000 but a purchase of £500,001 would be liable for £20,000. The result is that SDLT had a distorting effect on the housing market, because a house is very difficult to sell at prices just above each threshold, for example, £250,001. There were regular calls for a different structure for stamp duty to avoid the distorting effect that the slab tax structure has on the housing market.

The effect at each trigger point is shown in the table below.

House price £	SDLT £ until 2014	SDLT £ from 2014
125,000	0	0
125,001	1,250	0
250,000	2,500	2,500
250,001	7,500	2,500
500,000	15,000	15,000
500,001	20,000	15,000
1,000,000	40,000	43,750
1,000,001	50,000	43,750
2,000,000	100,000	153,750
2,000,001	140,000 (bought by individuals); 300,000 (bought by corporations)	153,750

==== Tax relief ====
Certain properties may be eligible for SDLT relief. For example, if a residential property being purchased is uninhabitable (for example: severe leakage, mould, asbestos or unsafe wiring) then tax relief or an exemption may be obtained.

=== Comparison with the devolved taxes ===
Since the devolution of property transaction taxes, the three regimes in Great Britain have diverged significantly.

In 2026/27, tax begins at £125,000 in England and Northern Ireland, £145,000 in Scotland and £225,000 in Wales. England and Scotland operate first-time buyer reliefs while Wales has none. The treatment of additional properties differs in structure as well as rate, with England and Northern Ireland adding 5% to each band, Scotland charging an 8% Additional Dwelling Supplement on the whole price, and Wales applying a separate schedule of higher rates. The same purchase can therefore attract different tax bills in each nation: on a £300,000 home, a first-time buyer pays nothing in England, £4,000 in Scotland and £4,500 in Wales; a home mover pays £5,000, £4,600 and £4,500 respectively; and a buyer of an additional property pays £20,000, £28,600 and £19,950.

== See also ==
- Berthold's Political Handkerchief
- Cost of moving house in the United Kingdom
- Finance Act 1986 of the UK
- Financial transaction tax
- Property tax
- Residential property market in the United Kingdom
- Taxes on knowledge
- Transfer tax
