= Stamp Duties Management Act 1891 =

Act of the Parliament of the United Kingdom

Stamp Duties Management Act 1891 (Note: Section 30.)
- Act of Parliament
- Parliament of the United Kingdom
- Long title: An Act to consolidate the Law relating to the Management of Stamp Duties.
- Citation: 54 & 55 Vict. c. 38
- Introduced by: William Jackson MP (Commons)
- Territorial extent: United Kingdom

Dates
- Royal assent: 21 July 1891
- Commencement: 1 January 1892 (Note: Section 29.)

Other legislation
- Amends: See § Repealed enactments
- Repeals/revokes: See § Repealed enactments
- Amended by: Forgery Act 1913; Pharmacy and Medicines Act 1941; Crown Proceedings Act 1947; Customs and Excise Act 1952; Post Office Act 1953; Post Office Act 1961; Customs and Excise Management Act 1979; Statute Law (Repeals) Act 1981; Statute Law (Repeals) Act 1993; Finance Act 1994; Finance Act 1996; Finance Act 1998; Finance Act 1999; Stamp Duty (Method of Denoting Duty) Regulations 2019
- Relates to: Stamp Duties Management Act 1870; Stamp Act 1870; Stamp Act 1891

Status: Amended

History of passage through Parliament

Records of Parliamentary debate relating to the statute from Hansard

Text of statute as originally enacted

Revised text of statute as amended

Text of the Stamp Duties Management Act 1891 as in force today (including any amendments) within the United Kingdom, from legislation.gov.uk.

The Stamp Duties Management Act 1891 (54 & 55 Vict. c. 38) is an act of the Parliament of the United Kingdom that consolidated enactments relating to the management of stamp duty in the United Kingdom.

The act was passed at the same time as the Stamp Act 1891 (54 & 55 Vict. c. 39).

== Background ==
In 1870, the Stamp Act 1870 (33 & 34 Vict. c. 97) and the (33 & 34 Vict. c. 98) were passed to amend and consolidate the law that had evolved over the last century relating to stamp duty and other inland revenue.

== Passage ==
Leave to bring in the Stamp Duties Management Bill to the House of Commons was granted to the Chancellor of the Exchequer, George Goschen, MP William Jackson MP, and the Solicitor General, Sir Edward Clarke MP, on 2 May 1891. The bill had its first reading in the House of Commons on 2 May 1891, presented by William Jackson MP. The bill had its second reading in the House of Commons on X and was committed to the Standing Committee on Law, &c., which reported on 26 June 1891, with amendments. The amended bill had its third reading in the House of Commons on 6 July 1891 and passed, without amendments.

The bill had its first reading in the House of Lords on 7 July 1891. The bill had its second reading in the House of Lords on 14 July 1891 and was committed to a committee of the whole house, which met and reported on 16 July 1891, without amendments. The bill had its third reading in the House of Lords on 17 July 1891 and passed, without amendments.

The bill was granted royal assent on 21 July 1891.

== Provisions ==
=== Repealed enactments ===
Section 28 of the act repealed 15 enactments, listed in the schedule to the act.

Citation	Short Title	Title	Extent of repeal
39 & 40 Geo. 3. c. 72	Administration of Estates (Probate) Act 1800	An Act to amend several laws relating to the duties on stamped vellum, parchment, and paper.	The whole Act.
42 Geo. 3. c. 56	Medicines Stamp Act 1802	An Act to repeal an Act passed in the twenty-fifth year of the reign of His present Majesty for granting stamp duties on certain medicines and for charging other duties in lieu thereof, and for making effectual provision for the better collection of the said duties.	Sections eighteen, twenty-five, and twenty-eight.
52 Geo. 3. c. 150	Medicines Stamp Act 1812	An Act to amend an Act passed in the forty-fourth year of His Majesty's reign for granting stamp duties in Great Britain, so far as regards the duties granted on medicines and on licences for vending the same.	Section two, from "to be recovered," to the end of the section, and three.
55 Geo. 3. c. 184	Stamp Act 1815	An Act for repealing the stamp duties on deeds, law proceedings, and other written or printed instruments, and the duties on fire insurances, and on legacies and successions to personal estate upon intestacies, now payable in Great Britain, and for granting other duties in lieu thereof.	Sections fifty-two and fifty-three.
3 & 4 Vict. c. 96	Post Office (Duties) Act 1840	An Act for the regulation of the duties of postage.	Sections nineteen, twenty-one from "and all" to the end of the section and twenty-two to thirty.
13 & 14 Vict. c. 97	Stamp Duties Act 1850	An Act to repeal certain stamp duties, to grant others in lieu thereof, and to amend the laws relating to the stamp duties.	The whole Act.
23 & 24 Vict. c. 111	Stamp Duties Act 1860	An Act for granting to Her Majesty certain duties of stamps, and to amend the laws relating to the stamp duties.	Section twenty-two.
25 & 26 Vict. c. 22	Revenue Act 1862	An Act to repeal certain duties of Customs and Inland Revenue for the service of Her Majesty, and to grant, alter, and repeal certain other duties.	Section forty-one.
30 & 31 Vict. c. 23	Customs and Inland Revenue Act 1867	An Act to grant and alter certain duties of Customs and Inland Revenue, and for other purposes relating thereto.	Sections seventeen and eighteen.
33 & 34 Vict. c. 97	Stamp Act 1870	The Stamp Act, 1870	Section twenty-five, so far as it relates to sections twenty-seven and twenty-eight.
33 & 34 Vict. c. 98	Stamp Duties Management Act 1870	The Stamp Duties Management Act, 1870.	The whole Act.
38 & 39 Vict. c. 22	Post Office Act 1875	The Post Office Act, 1875	The second, fourth and fifth paragraphs of section six.
38 & 39 Vict. c. 23	Customs and Inland Revenue Act 1875	The Customs and Inland Revenue Act, 1875.	Section thirteen.
45 & 46 Vict. c. 41	Customs and Inland Revenue Act 1882	The Customs and Inland Revenue Act, 1882.	Sub-section three of section five.
45 & 46 Vict. c. 72	Revenue, Friendly Societies, and National Debt Act 1882	The Revenue Friendly Societies and National Debt Act, 1882.	Section fifteen.

== Subsequent developments ==
The act was described as a Consolidation Act.

Section 28 of the act was repealed by section 1(1) of, and part V of schedule 1 to, the Statute Law (Repeals) Act 1981, which came into force on 21 May 1981.
