= Stamp Act 1891 =

Act of the Parliament of the United Kingdom

Stamp Act 1891 (Note: Section 125.)
- Act of Parliament
- Parliament of the United Kingdom
- Long title: An Act to consolidate the Enactments granting and relating to the Stamp Duties upon Instruments and certain other enactments relating to Stamp Duties.
- Citation: 54 & 55 Vict. c. 39
- Introduced by: William Jackson MP (Commons)
- Territorial extent: United Kingdom

Dates
- Royal assent: 21 July 1891
- Commencement: 1 January 1892 (Note: Section 124.)
Other legislation
Amends	See § Repealed enactments
Repeals/revokes	See § Repealed enactments
Amended by	Revenue Act 1909; Solicitors Act 1932; Solicitors (Scotland) Act 1933; Administration of Justice (Miscellaneous Provisions) Act 1933; Solicitors, Public Notaries, &c. Act 1949; Finance Act 1949; Finance Act 1952; Marine and Aviation Insurance (War Risks) Act 1952; Finance Act 1964; Finance Act 1965; Statute Law (Repeals) Act 1976; Companies Act 1985; Finance Act 1988; Statute Law (Repeals) Act 1993; Finance Act 1994; Finance Act 1996; Finance Act 1999; Finance Act 2002; Finance Act 2004; Government Stock (Consequential and Transitional Provision) (No. 2) Order 2004; Statute Law (Repeals) Act 2008; Transfer of Tribunal Functions and Revenue and Customs Appeals Order 2009; Stamp Duty (Method of Denoting Duty) Regulations 2019; Finance Act 2020
Relates to	Stamp Duties Management Act 1870; Stamp Act 1870; Stamp Duties Management Act 1891

Status: Amended

Text of statute as originally enacted

Revised text of statute as amended

Text of the Stamp Act 1891 as in force today (including any amendments) within the United Kingdom, from legislation.gov.uk.

The Stamp Act 1891 (54 & 55 Vict. c. 39) is an act of the Parliament of the United Kingdom that consolidated enactments relating to stamp duty in the United Kingdom.

== Background ==
In 1870, the Stamp Act 1870 (33 & 34 Vict. c. 97) and the Stamp Duties Management Act 1870 (c. 98) were passed to amend and consolidate the law that had evolved over the last century relating to stamp duty and other inland revenue.

== Passage ==
Leave to bring in the Stamp Duties Bill to the House of Commons was granted to the Chancellor of the Exchequer, George Goschen, MP William Jackson MP, and the Solicitor General, Sir Edward Clarke MP, on 2 May 1891. The bill had its first reading in the House of Commons on 2 May 1891, presented by William Jackson MP. The bill had its second reading in the House of Commons and was committed to the Standing Committee on Law, &c., which reported on 26 June 1891, with amendments. The amended bill had its third reading in the House of Commons on 6 July 1891 and passed, without amendments.

The bill had its first reading in the House of Lords on 7 July 1891. The bill had its second reading in the House of Lords on 14 July 1891 and was committed to a committee of the whole house, which met and reported on 16 July 1891, without amendments. The bill had its third reading in the House of Lords on 17 July 1891 and passed, without amendments.

The bill was granted royal assent on 21 July 1891.

== Provisions ==
=== Repealed enactments ===
Section 123 of the act repealed 26 enactments, listed in the third schedule to the act.

Citation	Short Title	Title	Extent of repeal
57 Geo. 3. c. 41	Paymaster General Act 1817	An Act to repeal two Acts passed in the fifty-fourth and fifty-fifth years of His present Majesty relating to the office of the Agent-General, and for transferring the duties of the said office to the office of the Paymaster-General and Secretary at War.	Section eight.
9 & 10 Vict. c. 17	Burgh Trading Act 1846	An Act for the abolition of the exclusive privilege of trading in burghs in Scotland.	Section one from "Provided always" to the end of the section.
28 & 29 Vict. c. 30	Revenue Act 1865	An Act to grant certain duties of customs and inland revenue.	Sections one and two, and Schedule B.
30 & 31 Vict. c. 23	Customs and Inland Revenue Act 1867	An Act to grant and alter certain duties of customs and inland revenue, and for other purposes relating thereto.	Except sections seventeen and eighteen.
33 & 34 Vict. c. 24	Metropolitan Board of Works (Loans) Act 1870	An Act for making further provision respecting the borrowing of money by the Metropolitan Board of Works.	Sections three and four.
33 & 34 Vict. c. 97	Stamp Act 1870	The Stamp Act, 1870	Except section twenty-five so far as it relates to sections (3) and (4) of section twenty-seven and twenty-eight.
34 & 35 Vict. c. 4	Stamps Act 1871	An Act to amend the Stamp Act, 1870, in relation to foreign securities, mortgages of stock, and proxy papers.	The whole Act.
34 & 35 Vict. c. 103	House Tax Act 1871	An Act to amend the law relating to the customs and inland revenue.	Section twenty-six.
36 & 37 Vict. c. 18	Customs and Inland Revenue Act 1873	The Customs and Inland Revenue Act, 1873.	Section five.
37 & 38 Vict. c. 19	Barrister's Admission, Stamp Duty Act 1874	An Act to amend the Stamp Act, 1870, in regard to the stamp duty payable by advocates in Scotland on admission, by writers to the signet in Scotland or Ireland, and by barristers in England or Ireland on admission as advocates in Scotland.	The whole Act.
37 & 38 Vict. c. 26	Canadian Stock Stamp Act 1874	The Canadian Stock Stamp Act, 1874.	The whole Act.
39 & 40 Vict. c. 6	Sea Insurances (Stamping of Policies) Amendment Act 1876	The Sea Insurance (Stamping of Policies) Act, 1876.	The whole Act.
39 & 40 Vict. c. 16	Customs and Inland Revenue Act 1876	The Customs and Inland Revenue Act, 1876.	Section eleven.
40 & 41 Vict. c. 59	Colonial Stock Act 1877	The Colonial Stock Act, 1877	Section two, and the first paragraph of section three.
41 & 42 Vict. c. 15	Customs and Inland Revenue Act 1878	The Customs and Inland Revenue Act, 1878.	Section twenty-seven.
43 & 44 Vict. c. 20	Inland Revenue Act 1880	The Inland Revenue Act, 1880	Sections fifty-three to fifty-six.
44 & 45 Vict. c. 12	Customs and Inland Revenue Act 1881	The Customs and Inland Revenue Act, 1881.	Sections forty-four to forty-seven.
45 & 46 Vict. c. 72	Revenue, Friendly Societies, and National Debt Act 1882	The Revenue Friendly Societies and National Debt Act, 1882.	Sections eight to ten, thirteen, and fourteen.
46 & 47 Vict. c. 55	Revenue Act 1883	The Revenue Act, 1883	Section fifteen.
47 & 48 Vict. c. 62	Revenue Act 1884	The Revenue Act, 1884	Sections eight to ten.
48 & 49 Vict. c. 51	Customs and Inland Revenue Act 1885	The Customs and Inland Revenue Act, 1885.	Section twenty-one.
50 & 51 Vict. c. 15	Customs and Inland Revenue Act 1887	The Customs and Inland Revenue Act, 1887.	Sections five to sixteen.
51 & 52 Vict. c. 8	Customs and Inland Revenue Act 1888	The Customs and Inland Revenue Act, 1888.	Sections ten to twelve, and First Schedule.
52 & 53 Vict. c. 7	Customs and Inland Revenue Act 1889	The Customs and Inland Revenue Act, 1889.	Sections sixteen and seventeen.
52 & 53 Vict. c. 42	Revenue Act 1889	The Revenue Act, 1889	Sections fifteen to seventeen.
53 & 54 Vict. c. 8	Customs and Inland Revenue Act 1890	The Customs and Inland Revenue Act, 1890.	Sections eighteen to twenty-one.

== Subsequent developments ==
The act was passed at the same time as the Stamp Duties Management Act 1891 (54 & 55 Vict. c. 38). The act was described as a Consolidation Act.

== Bibliography ==
- Great Britain; Highmore, N.J. (1911). The Stamp Laws: Being the Stamp Acts of 1891, with the Acts Amending and Extending the Same, Including the Finance (1909-10) Act, 1910 and the Revenue Act, 1911 : Together with Other Acts Imposing Or Relating to Stamp Duties on Instruments, Or Granting Exemptions from Stamp Duties, and Notes of Decided Cases : Also an Introduction and an Appendix Containing Tables Showing the Comparison with the Antecedent Law. Stevens.
