= Stamp Act 1712 =

Act of the Parliament of Great Britain

Taxation Act 1711
- Act of Parliament
- Parliament of Great Britain
- Long title: An Act for laying several Duties upon all Soap and Paper made in Great Britain, or imported into the same; and upon chequered and striped Linens imported; and upon certain Silks, Calicoes, Linens, and Stuffs, printed, painted, or stained; and upon several Kinds of stamped Vellum, Parchment, and Paper; and upon certain printed Papers, Pamphlets, and Advertisements; for raising the Sum of Eighteen Hundred Thousand Pounds, by Way of a Lottery, towards Her Majesty's Supply; and for licensing an additional Number of Hackney Chairs; and for charging certain Stocks of Cards and Dice; and for better securing Her Majesty's Duties to arise in the Office for the Stamp Duties, by Licenses for Marriages, and otherwise; and for Relief of Persons who have not claimed their Lottery Tickets in due Time, or have lost Exchequer Bills, or Lottery Tickets; and for borrowing Money upon Stock (Part of the Capital of the South Sea Company), for the Use of the Public.
- Citation: 10 Ann. c. 18 (Note: This is the citation in The Statutes of the Realm.); 10 Ann. c. 19 (Note: This is the citation in The Statutes at Large.)
- Territorial extent: Great Britain

Dates
- Royal assent: 22 May 1712
- Commencement: 10 June 1712 (Note: Section 1.)
- Repealed: 30 June 1874
Other legislation
Amended by	Continuance of Laws, etc. Act 1742; Customs Law Repeal Act 1825; Stamp Duties on Cards and Dice Act 1828; London Hackney Carriage Act 1831; Stamp Duties on Newspapers Act 1836; Duties on Paper Act 1839; Duties on Soap Act 1840; Statute Law Revision Act 1867
Repealed by	Revenue Officers' Disabilities Removal Act 1874
Relates to	Newspaper and Stamp Duties Act 1819

Status: Repealed

Text of statute as originally enacted

The Stamp Act 1712 (10 Ann. c. 18), also known as the Taxation Act 1711, was an act of the Parliament of Great Britain passed on 1 August 1712 to create a new tax on publishers, particularly of newspapers. Newspapers were subjected to tax and price increased. The stamp tax was a tax on each newspaper and thus hit cheaper papers and popular readership harder than wealthy consumers (because it formed a higher proportion of the purchase price). It was increased in 1797, reduced in 1836 and was finally ended in 1855, thus allowing a cheap press. It was enforced until its repeal in 1855. The initial assessed rate of tax was one penny per whole newspaper sheet, a halfpenny for a half sheet, and one shilling per advertisement contained within. The act had a potentially chilling effect on publishers; Jonathan Swift was a frequent publisher of newspapers, and complained in a letter about the new tax. Other than newspapers, it required that all pamphlets, legal documents, commercial bills, advertisements, and other papers issued the tax. The tax is blamed for the decline of English literature critical of the government during the period, notably with The Spectator ending the same year of the tax's enactment. It would see increasingly greater taxes and wider spectrum of materials affected until its repeal in 1855.

== Provisions of the act ==
The act raised £5,536 worth of stamps within the first year of operation. This duty would be further increased throughout its lifetime, with the maximum tax of four pence on all newspapers and three shillings and six pence on all advertisements. Publications which were sponsored by the government, or received sponsorship after the act, would be exempted from the tax.

=== The newspaper tax ===
The newspaper tax would be expanded through the Newspaper and Stamp Duties Act 1819 (60 Geo. 3 & 1 Geo. 4. c. 9) to include all publications which sold for less than six pence, contained an opinion about news, or which were published more frequently than every twenty-six days. It was repealed on 1 July 1855.

== Background ==
The tax was implemented with the stated intention of raising funds for the English state lottery, to monitor the circulation of newspapers and other periodicals, and to restrict publication of writing intended to "excite hatred and contempt of the Government and holy religion". All periodicals were already required by law to state the address and name of the owner, making taxation easily enforced on publishers, and allowing the government to see where legally printed publications were coming from. In order to exempt themselves from the tax, periodical authors pledged their patronage to members of the Parliament of Great Britain, leading to publications rising and falling based on the party in power and a general distrust in periodicals of the time.

== Response ==
British essayists were critical of the tax and the effect it had on British literature. According to English writer Samuel Johnson, "A news-writer is a man without virtue who writes lies at home for his own profit. To these compositions is required neither genius nor knowledge, neither industry nor sprightliness, but contempt of shame and indifference to truth are absolutely necessary." These essayists often saw retribution for their published words; Henry Hetherington, a prominent radical, was imprisoned for claiming the tax was a tax on knowledge, and his printing presses were ordered to be destroyed. Many others greeted the arrival of the stamps with outrage and violence. Most called for a boycott and some organised attacks on the customhouses and homes of tax collectors.

== Subsequent developments ==
Sections 162, 163 and 166–170 of the act were repealed by section 1 of the Stamp Duties on Cards and Dice Act 1828 (9 Geo. 4. c. 18), which came into force on 5 July 1828.

Sections 1–104, 138–187, and 199 to the end of the act, were repealed by section 1 of, and the schedule to, the Statute Law Revision Act 1867 (30 & 31 Vict. c. 59), which came into force on 15 July 1867.

== Sources ==
- Clarke, Bob (2004), From Grub Street to Fleet Street: an illustrated history of English newspapers to 1899 (Illustrated ed.), Ashgate Publishing Ltd., ISBN 0-7546-5007-3
