= Taxes on knowledge =

Slogan advocating for improving access to information and the press

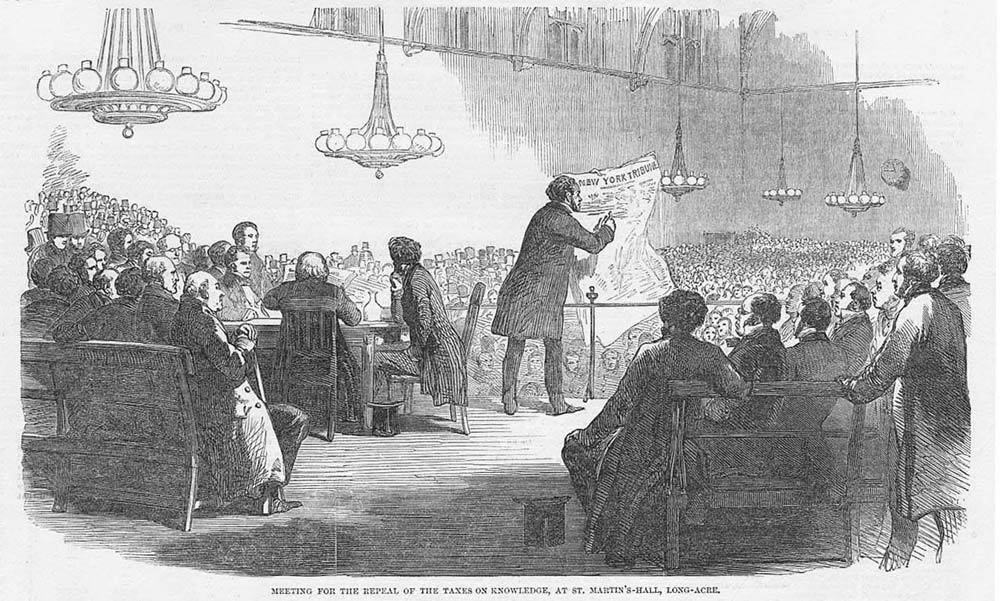
Meeting for the Repeal of the Taxes on Knowledge, 1851

Taxes on knowledge was a slogan defining an extended British campaign against duties and taxes on newspapers, their advertising content, and the paper they were printed on. The paper tax was early identified as an issue: "A tax upon Paper, is a tax upon Knowledge" is a saying attributed to Alexander Adam (1741–1809), a Scottish headmaster.

== Administration of Lord Liverpool and the press ==
The "taxes on knowledge" were at their peak in 1815, as the Napoleonic Wars ended. The Liverpool administration actively discouraged certain sections of the press, with prosecutions, including those for seditious libel, aimed at editors and writers. The principle of taxing publications and pamphlets had been introduced by the Stamp Act 1712, at the level of a halfpenny (½d.). The duty had risen over time to 4d.

The Newspaper and Stamp Duties Act 1819 was not very effective in controlling the circulation of news, but cramped the development of newspapers. It was aimed at the journalism of William Cobbett, the Hunt brothers (The Examiner), and Thomas Jonathan Wooler (The Black Dwarf). From 1819, "newspaper" was defined carefully, and the fiscal burden fell on all periodicals that were more frequently published than monthly, and priced below 6d. It had a negative effect on the English provincial press, i.e. newspapers outside London; and drove out cheap political papers.

== The War of the Unstamped ==
Stamp duty was levied on newspapers, and the first phase of the campaign was the distribution of newspapers that were unstamped, and therefore illegal. A central figure of this "war of the unstamped" was Henry Hetherington. His unstamped paper, The Poor Man's Guardian, was launched in 1831. It tested the boundaries of the government's willingness to enforce the duty, recruiting hundreds of paper sellers and flaunting its illegal status. The National Union of the Working Classes took up the attack on "taxes on knowledge"; it had an Owenite background, with the British Association for Promoting Co-operative Knowledge founded in 1829.

The Whig government of the time faced the opinion of Lord Brougham, Lord Chancellor from 1830 to 1834, that newspapers should be available for 1d., rather than 7d. John Crawfurd in 1836 attempted an account of the "taxes on knowledge" total, including amounts for taxation of paper and advertisements, and postal charges.

== Stamp Duties on Newspapers Act 1836 ==
The "war of the unstamped" saw nearly 800 people imprisoned. In 1834 the stamp duty was abolished on pamphlets; and in the Stamp Duties on Newspapers Act 1836 (6 & 7 Will. 4. c. 76) newspaper duty was reduced to 1d., from 4d., by Thomas Spring Rice as Chancellor of the Exchequer. On the other hand, the penalties for evasion of the duties were made more serious, and the definition of periodicals in the scope of the duty was broadened. The measures did not make for a cheap press or a free one.

Figures for number of stamps issued for newspapers are:

1801	16,085,085
1824	26,208,003
1837	53,897,926
1848	78,298.125

The year 1836 also saw the creation of the Provincial Newspaper Society, a trade association later called the Newspaper Society, which came to oppose further fiscal reform, as did The Times.

== Continuing campaign and Knowledge Chartism ==
John Francis of The Athenaeum was a persistent campaigner against taxes affecting publications, as they stood in the later 1830s, including paper duty at 1½d. per pound, and advertisement duty at a flat rate of 1s. 6d. Advertising duty had been cut in 1833: before that it had stood at 3s. 6d; paper duty had been 3d. per pound to 1837. Charles Knight the publisher of the Library of Useful Knowledge wanted paper duty abolished, but saw reason in the newspaper duty to avoid a popular radical press. The short-lived Association of Working Men to Procure a Cheap and Honest Press of early 1836 in effect became in a matter of months the London Working Men's Association.

Hetherington and William Lovett advocated, within the Chartist movement, a Knowledge Chartism, or gradualist approach to complete repeal of the taxes on knowledge and building of popular education. Their direction was forthrightly condemned by Feargus O'Connor. In line with O'Connor's views, the taxes on knowledge were marginal to the main thrust of a decade Chartist agitation, until the late 1840s. Varieties of Knowledge Chartism were displayed in the 1840s by Joseph Barker (the "Barker Library"), Samuel Smiles (self-help), and John Epps (opposition to medical jargon).

The campaign against "taxes on knowledge" made further progress in the 1850s, after more fundamental Chartist political agitation dropped back. The People's Charter Union of 1848 was set up primarily to oppose O'Connor. It had as treasurer Richard Moore, who conducted a steady activist role in the abolition of the newspaper stamp duty. Via the intermediate National Stamp Abolition Committee, by making the central organisational vehicle the new Association for Promoting the Repeal of Taxes on Knowledge (APRTOK, also called Society for the Repeal of the Taxes on Knowledge) he was able to involve Richard Cobden. Cobden had already publicised in 1848 his wish to remove some of the taxes.

The successful drive for reform was recognised by William Edwin Adams as "a twelve years' agitation". Secretary of APRTOK was Collet Dobson Collet. The President from 1850 was Thomas Milner Gibson. John Watts researched parliamentary questions for Milner Gibson, the Member of Parliament who chaired the 1851 Select Committee on Newspaper Stamps, but who then fell foul of Jeremiah Garnett, editor of the Manchester Guardian. Milner Gibson commented that Garnett "was a free trader who did not like free trade in newspapers".

== End of the "taxes on knowledge" ==
Advertisement duty was abolished in 1853, followed by newspaper stamp duty in 1855. The paper duty was removed in 1861. William Gladstone, as Chancellor of the Exchequer, repealed the paper duties, but only after a false start in 1860, when the House of Lords rejected his bill, against conventions on financial issues. The following year Gladstone returned to the measure, consolidated into a Budget Finance Bill, the first such: the Lords chose not to reject the Budget as a whole.

== Consequences ==
The repeal of "taxes on knowledge" was one factor in a number promoting an increase of publications in the United Kingdom, in the second half of the 19th century. In brief, the British press took on a role as mass media.

The first paper to derive a clear benefit from the fiscal changes was The Daily Telegraph. It was launched in 1855, a penny paper, one of many that appeared. The Saturday Review was a weekly magazine, also set up in 1855, and which featured new authors. New provincial daily newspapers were also seen.

The Bookseller in April 1861, just before the repeal of the paper duty, gave statistics on London newspapers: in 1830 there had been 64, of which three were for a working-class readership; in 1860 there were 177, eight being for the working classes. These numbers were attributed to John Francis. Total weekly circulation (i.e. issues, rather than readers) had risen from 399,747 to 2,284,600.

Newspaper reading habits changed, towards purchase and reading at home. The older habits—the use of a reading room, club or newsroom with newspapers, the hire of a paper by the hour in a public house—began to fall away.
