= 2nd Parliament of Great Britain =

| ← | 1st | 3rd | → |
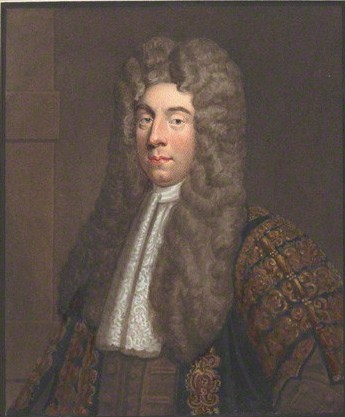
- Richard Onslow, Speaker of the House of Commons

Overview
- Term: 8 July 1708 – 21 April 1710

House of Commons
- Members: 558 MPs
- Speaker of the House of Commons: Richard Onslow

House of Lords
- Lord Keeper of the Great Seal: William Cowper

Sessions
- 1st: 16 November 1708 – 21 April 1709
- 2nd: 15 November 1709 – 5 April 1710

The 2nd Parliament of Great Britain was the first elected Parliament of Great Britain, as the 1st Parliament of Great Britain had been drawn from the former Parliament of England and Parliament of Scotland.

The Parliament was summoned by Anne, Queen of Great Britain on 26 April 1708. The members of the House of Commons of Great Britain were elected between 30 April 1708 and 7 July 1708 and summoned to meet on 8 July 1708. Under the Triennial Act 1694, the Parliament was due to expire, if not dissolved sooner, at the end of the term of three years from the first meeting. It was actually dissolved on 21 September 1710.

== Summary of the members of Parliament ==
Key to categories in the following tables: BC - Borough/Burgh constituencies, CC - County constituencies, UC - University constituencies, Total C - Total constituencies, BMP - Borough/Burgh Members of Parliament, CMP - County Members of Parliament, UMP - University Members of Parliament.

Table 1: Constituencies and MPs, by type and country

| Country | BC | CC | UC | Total C | BMP | CMP | UMP | Total MPs |
|---|---|---|---|---|---|---|---|---|
| England | 202 | 39 | 2 | 243 | 404 | 78 | 4 | 486 |
| Wales | 13 | 13 | 0 | 26 | 13 | 14 | 0 | 27 |
| Scotland | 15 | 30 | 0 | 45 | 15 | 30 | 0 | 45 |
| Total | 230 | 82 | 2 | 314 | 432 | 122 | 4 | 558 |

Table 2: Number of seats per constituency, by type and country

| Country | BCx1 | BCx2 | BCx4 | CCx1 | CCx2 | UCx2 | Total C |
|---|---|---|---|---|---|---|---|
| England | 4 | 196 | 2 | 0 | 39 | 2 | 243 |
| Wales | 13 | 0 | 0 | 12 | 1 | 0 | 26 |
| Scotland | 15 | 0 | 0 | 30 | 0 | 0 | 45 |
| Total | 32 | 196 | 2 | 42 | 40 | 2 | 314 |

Party Composition: An estimate of the approximate Party composition was Whig 291 and Tory 222.

== Speaker and ministries ==
On 16 November 1708, Sir Richard Onslow, Bt (1654-1717), MP (Whig) for Surrey since 1689, was elected the second Speaker of the House of Commons of Great Britain.

This Parliament was held before the office of Prime Minister had formally come into existence. However the Lord High Treasurer (or when that office was in commission the First Lord of the Treasury) was the most powerful and important minister of the Crown. The Lord High Treasurer at that time (in office in England and then Great Britain since 8 May 1702) was Sidney Godolphin, 1st Earl of Godolphin. Godolphin was a Tory, but the Ministry, as last reconstructed in February 1708, included both Tory and Whig members. The factions supporting the Ministry (the 'Court Party') were the Churchill Tories (followers of John Churchill, 1st Duke of Marlborough), Court Tory and Whig supporters of any Ministers the Queen cared to appoint, the Walpole-Townshend Whigs and Junto Whigs. They were opposed by the 'Country Party'. The main task of the Ministry was to support Marlborough's armies in continental Europe during the War of the Spanish Succession and Godolphin's financial expertise was essential to that task.

Queen Anne initiated a complete change of Ministry in August 1710. To an extent unusual in the period Godolphin and his friends were all removed from office. A new Ministry was constructed composed of Court Party supporters and Tory groups led by Robert Harley, Laurence Hyde, 1st Earl of Rochester and Henry St John. Harley, the ambitious member for Radnor Boroughs, had become associated with the Tories since Godolphin and Marlborough had forced his resignation from the government in 1708.

On 10 August 1710, the office of Lord High Treasurer was put in commission. John Poulett, 1st Earl Poulett became First Lord of the Treasury and Robert Harley the Chancellor of the Exchequer (and Second Lord of the Treasury).

Soon after taking office the new Ministers arranged for Parliament to be dissolved.

== Notable acts passed by the Parliament ==
- Advowsons Act 1708
- Bank of England Act 1708
- Commissions of Sewers Act 1708
- Diplomatic Privileges Act 1708
- Foreign Protestants Naturalization Act 1708
- Middlesex Registry Act 1708
- Parochial Libraries Act 1708
- Smithfield Market, etc. Act 1708
- Treason Act 1708
- Bank of England Act 1709
- Circuit Courts (Scotland) Act 1709
- Copyright Act 1709
- Eddystone Lighthouse Act 1709
- Landlord and Tenant Act 1709
- Militia Act 1709
- Quarantine Act 1710
- Lotteries Act 1710
- Post Office (Revenues) Act 1710

== See also ==
- 1708 British general election
- List of MPs elected in the 1708 British general election
- Godolphin–Marlborough ministry 1702-1710
- List of acts of the 1st session of the 2nd Parliament of Great Britain
- List of acts of the 2nd session of the 2nd Parliament of Great Britain
- List of parliaments of Great Britain

== Sources ==
- (Election dates in 1708) - British Electoral Facts 1832-1999, compiled and edited by Colin Rallings & Michael Thrasher (Ashgate 2000).
- (The change of Ministry in 1710) - His Majesty's Opposition 1714-1830 by Archibald S. Foord (Clarendon Press 1964)

| Preceded by 1st Parliament of Great Britain | 2nd Parliament of Great Britain; 1708–1710 | Succeeded by 3rd Parliament of Great Britain |
