= Country Bankers Act 1826 =

Act of the Parliament of the United Kingdom

Country Bankers Act 1826 (Note: The citation of this act by this short title was authorised by section 1 of, and the first schedule to, the Short Titles Act 1896. Due to the repeal of those provisions it is now authorised by section 19(2) of the Interpretation Act 1978.)
- Act of Parliament
- Parliament of the United Kingdom
- Long title: An Act for the better regulating Copartnerships of certain Bankers in England; and for amending so much of an Act of the Thirty ninth and Fortieth Years of the Reign of His late Majesty King George the Third, intituled "An Act for establishing an Agreement with the Governor and Company of the Bank of England, for advancing the Sum of Three Millions towards the Supply for the Service of the Year One thousand eight hundred," as relates to the same.
- Citation: 7 Geo. 4. c. 46
- Territorial extent: United Kingdom

Dates
- Royal assent: 26 May 1826
- Commencement: 26 May 1826 (Note: Section 1.)
- Repealed: 23 July 1958
Other legislation
Amends	Bank of England Act 1800
Amended by	Statute Law Revision Act 1873; Statute Law Revision Act 1890; Perjury Act 1911; Indictments Act 1915; Statute Law Revision Act 1950
Repealed by	Statute Law Revision Act 1958

Status: Repealed

Text of statute as originally enacted

The Country Bankers Act 1826 (7 Geo. 4. c. 46) was an act of the Parliament of the United Kingdom enacted during the reign of George IV. The Act restricted the issue of banknotes by commercial banks in England and Wales. It relaxed some of the laws of the Bank of England Act 1709, allowing joint-stock banks with more than six partners to issue bank notes, as long as they were located more than 65 miles (105 km) from London.

The act also allowed the Bank of England to open branches in major provincial cities, enabling better distribution for its notes.

The Country Bankers Act 1826 was one of the Bank Notes Acts 1826 to 1852.

== Subsequent developments ==
Sections 16 and 17 of the act were repealed by section 1(1) of, and the first schedule to, the Statute Law Revision Act 1950 (14 Geo. 6. c. 6), which came into force on 23 May 1950.

The whole act was repealed by section 1 of, and the first schedule to, the Statute Law Revision Act 1958 (6 & 7 Eliz. 2. c. 46), which came into force on 23 July 1958.
