= Bank of England Act 1696 =

Act of the Parliament of England

Bank of England Act 1696 (Note: The citation of this act by this short title was authorised by section 1 of, and the first schedule to, the Short Titles Act 1896. Due to the repeal of those provisions it is now authorised by section 19(2) of the Interpretation Act 1978.)
- Act of Parliament
- Parliament of England
- Long title: An Act for making good the Deficiencies of several Funds therein mentioned and for enlargeing the Capital Stock of the Bank of England and for raising the Publick Creditt. (Note: These words are printed against this act in the second column of the first schedule to the Short Titles Act 1896, which is headed "Title".)
- Citation: 8 & 9 Will. 3. c. 20
- Territorial extent: England and Wales

Dates
- Royal assent: 1 April 1697
- Commencement: 20 October 1696 (Note: Start of session.)
- Repealed: 18 July 1973
Other legislation
Amended by	Bank of England Act 1708; Forgery Act 1830; Statute Law Revision Act 1867; Statute Law Revision Act 1871; Statute Law Revision Act 1888; Administration of Justice Act 1965
Repealed by	Statute Law (Repeals) Act 1973
Relates to	Bank of England Act 1694

Status: Repealed

Text of statute as originally enacted

The Bank of England Act 1696 (8 & 9 Will. 3. c. 20) was an act of the Parliament of England. It was one of the Bank of England Acts 1694 to 1892.

== Subsequent developments ==
Provisoes or conditions contained in this act, and in the Bank of England Act 1694 (5 & 6 Will. & Mar. c. 20), for determining a fund of £100,000 per annum, and the corporation of the governor and company of the Bank of England, upon the respective notices and payments in both acts mentioned, were repealed and made void by section 8 of the Bank of England Act 1708 (7 Ann. c. 30) (which is section 5 of chapter 7 in Ruffhead's Edition).

So much of the act as related to forging or counterfeiting the common seal of the Governor and Company of the Bank of England, or any sealed bank bill, or any bank note, or altering or raising any indorsement on any bank bill or note was repealed as to England on 21 July 1830 by section 31 of the Forgery Act 1830 (11 Geo. 4 & 1 Will. 4. c. 66). The marginal note to that section says that the effect of this was to repeal section 36.

Sections 1–25, 29, 38–44, 50, 51, 53–61, 63–68, 70 and 71 were repealed by section 1 of, and the schedule to, the Statute Law Revision Act 1867 (30 & 31 Vict. c. 59), which came into force on 15 July 1867.

Section 62 and 69 of the act were repealed by section 1 of, and the schedule to, the Statute Law Revision Act 1871 (34 & 35 Vict. c. 116), which came into force on 21 August 1871.

Section 46 of the act was repealed by section 34(1) of, and schedule 2 to, the Administration of Justice Act 1965, which came into force on 27 April 1965.

The whole act was repealed by section 1(1) of, and part IV of schedule 1 to, the Statute Law (Repeals) Act 1973, which came into force on 18 July 1973.
