= Statute Law (Repeals) Act 1973 =

Act of the Parliament of the United Kingdom

Statute Law (Repeals) Act 1973 (Note: Section 3.)
- Act of Parliament
- Parliament of the United Kingdom
- Long title: An Act to provide for the reform of the statute law by the repeal, in accordance with recommendations of the Law Commission and the Scottish Law Commission of certain enactments which, except so far as their effect is preserved, are no longer of practical utility.
- Citation: 1973 c. 39
- Territorial extent: United Kingdom; British Colonies (Note: Section 2(2). The Statute Law (Repeals) Act 1973 (Colonies) Order 1976 (SI 1976/54).); Section 2(2). Isle of Man (Note: The Statute Law Repeals (Isle of Man) Order 1984 (SI 1984/1692)); (Note: Section 2.)

Dates
- Royal assent: 18 July 1973
- Commencement: 18 July 1973 (Note: The Acts of Parliament (Commencement) Act 1793.)
Other legislation
Amends	Bishoprics Act 1878; Truck Amendment Act 1887; House of Commons Disqualification Act 1957; Horticulture Act 1960; See § Repealed enactments
Repeals/revokes	See § Repealed enactments
Amended by	House of Commons Disqualification Act 1975; Statute Law (Repeals) Act 1998; Statute Law (Repeals) Act 2004
Relates to	See Statute Law (Repeals) Act

Status: Amended

Text of statute as originally enacted

The Statute Law (Repeals) Act 1973 (c. 39) is an act of the Parliament of the United Kingdom, which implemented recommendations contained in the fourth report on statute law revision, by the Law Commission and the Scottish Law Commission.

As of 2026, the act remains partly in the United Kingdom.

== Background ==
The act implemented recommendations contained in the fourth report on statute law revision, by the Law Commission and the Scottish Law Commission.

== Provisions ==
The power conferred by section 2(2) of the act was exercised by

- The Statute Law (Repeals) Act 1973 (Colonies) Order 1976 (SI 1976/54)
- The Statute Law Repeals (Isle of Man) Order 1984 (SI 1984/1692).

=== Repealed enactments ===
Section 1(1) of the act repealed 256 enactments, listed in parts I to XIII of schedule 1 to the act.

==== Part I: Enactments relating to the demise of the Crown ====
Part I — Enactments relating to the demise of the Crown
Citation	Short title	Extent of repeal
6 Ann. c. 41 (Note: This is the citation in The Statutes of the Realm.)	Succession to the Crown Act 1707	Section 8.
11 Geo. 4 & 1 Will. 4. c. 43	Demise of the Crown Act 1830	The whole act except section 4. In section 4, the words " heretofore granted or ".
1 Will. 4. c. 4	Colonial Offices Act 1830	The whole act.
7 Will. 4 & 1 Vict. c. 31	Demise of the Crown Act 1837	The whole act.
37 & 38 Vict. c. 81	Great Seal (Offices) Act 1874	In section 8, the words from " and shall continue " to " successors ".
39 & 40 Vict. c. 59	Appellate Jurisdiction Act 1876	In section 6, the words from " and shall continue " to " Crown ".
50 & 51 Vict. c. 55	Sheriffs Act 1887	In section 3(3), the words " of the Crown, or in Cornwall ".
1 Edw. 7. c. 5	Demise of the Crown Act 1901	Section 1(2).
Act of Parliament of Ireland
21 & 22 Geo. 3. c. 48 (I)	Yelverton's Act (Ireland) 1781	In section 3, the words " of any office, civil or military or ".

==== Part II: Ecclesiastical enactments relating to bishoprics ====
Part II — Ecclesiastical enactments relating to bishoprics
Citation	Short title	Extent of repeal
10 & 11 Vict. c. 108	Ecclesiastical Commissioners Act 1847	The whole act.
38 & 39 Vict. c. 34	Bishopric of St. Albans Act 1875	The whole act.
39 & 40 Vict. c. 54	Bishopric of Truro Act 1876	The whole act.
41 & 42 Vict. c. 68	Bishoprics Act 1878	The whole act except sections 1 and 5.
47 & 48 Vict. c. 66	Bishopric of Bristol Act 1884	Section 2. In section 3, in paragraph (1), the words from " and in the construction " onwards, and paragraphs (3) and (5). The Schedule.
57 & 58 Vict. c. 21	Bishopric of Bristol Amendment Act 1894	The whole act.
59 & 60 Vict. c. 29	Bishopric of Bristol Amendment Act 1896	The whole act.
4 Edw. 7. c. 30	Bishoprics of Southwark and Birmingham Act 1904	The whole act.
3 & 4 Geo. 5. c. 36	Bishoprics of Sheffield, Chelmsford, and for the County of Suffolk Act 1913	The whole act.
7 & 8 Geo. 5. c. 57	Bishoprics of Bradford and Coventry Act 1918	The whole act.
Church Assembly Measures
14 & 15 Geo. 5. No. 4	Bishopric of Blackburn Measure 1923	The whole measure except sections 1 and 13.
14 & 15 Geo. 5. No. 5	Diocese of Southwell (Division) Measure 1923	The whole measure.
14 & 15 Geo. 5. No. 6	Diocese of Winchester (Division) Measure 1923	The whole measure.
15 & 16 Geo. 5. No. 2	Bishopric of Leicester Measure 1925	The whole measure.
25 & 26 Geo. 5. No. 1	Diocese of Southwell (Transfer) Measure 1935	The whole measure.

The repeal by the act of an enactment mentioned in this part of the schedule does not affect any order in council or scheme which, immediately before the repeal takes effect, was in force by virtue of that enactment.

==== Part III: Other ecclesiastical enactments ====
Part III — Other ecclesiastical enactments
Citation	Short title	Description	Extent of repeal
5 Eliz. 1. c. 28	Welsh Bible and Divine Service Act 1563	An Acte for the translating of the Bible and the Dyvine Service into the Welshe Tongue.	The whole act.
14 Cha. 2. c. 4	Act of Uniformity 1662	The Act of Uniformity 1662.	In section 5, the words from " upon pain " onwards. Section 11. In section 13, the words from " the present governour " to " and two and ". Sections 22 and 23.
6 Ann. c. 8	Maintenance of Church of England Act 1706	An Act for securing the Church of England as by law established.	In section 1, the words from " Act made in the thirteenth year ", where first occurring, to " and also another ".
6 Ann. c. 11	Union with Scotland Act 1706	The Union with Scotland Act 1706.	In section 3, the words from " Act made in the thirteenth year ", where first occurring, to " and also another ".
10 Ann. c. 43 Pr.	Deal Chapel Act 1711	An Act for completing a chapel of ease in the lower town of Deal in the county of Kent by a duty on waterborn coals to be brought into the said town.	Sections 1 to 5.
4 Geo. 4. c. 79	Additional Places of Worship in the Highlands Act 1823	An Act for building additional places of worship in the Highlands and Islands of Scotland.	The whole act.
5 Geo. 4. c. 90	Church of Scotland Act 1824	An Act to amend an Act for building additional places of worship in the Highlands and Islands of Scotland.	The whole act.
15 & 16 Vict. c. 53	Bishop of Quebec Act 1852	An Act to provide for the exercise of certain powers vested in the Bishop of Quebec in respect of districts severed from his diocese.	The whole act.
28 & 29 Vict. c. 89	Greenwich Hospital Act 1865	The Greenwich Hospital Act 1865.	Section 44.

==== Part IV: Enactments relating to banking ====
Part IV — Enactments relating to banking
Citation	Short title	Description	Extent of repeal
8 & 9 Will. 3. c. 20	Bank of England Act 1696	The Bank of England Act 1696.	The whole act.
15 Geo. 2. c. 13	Bank of England Act 1741	The Bank of England Act 1741.	The whole act.
5 Geo. 3. c. 49	Bank Notes (Scotland) Act 1765	The Bank Notes (Scotland) Act 1765.	Section 2. In sections 4, 5 and 6, the words " post bill ", " post bills " and " or post bills ", wherever occurring.
12 Geo. 3. c. 72	Bills of Exchange (Scotland) Act 1772	The Bills of Exchange (Scotland) Act 1772.	In section 39, the words " or post bills ", " in either of the cases before mentioned " and " said bills and ".
39 & 40 Geo. 3. c. 28	Bank of England Act 1800	The Bank of England Act 1800.	The whole act.
45 Geo. 3. c. 89	Bank Notes (Forgery) Act 1805	The Bank Notes (Forgery) Act 1805.	In section 3, the words " or bank post bill " and " or blank bank post bill " wherever occurring. In section 4, the words " in guineas, or ". In sections 5, 6 and 7, the words " bank post bill ", " or bank post bill ", " and bank post bills " and " or blank bank post bill ", wherever occurring.
56 Geo. 3. c. 96	Bank of England (Advance) Act 1816	The Bank of England (Advance) Act 1816.	The whole act.
3 & 4 Will. 4. c. 83	Bank Notes Act 1833	The Bank Notes Act 1833.	The whole act.
3 & 4 Will. 4. c. 98	Bank of England Act 1833	The Bank of England Act 1833.	The whole act.
5 & 6 Will. 4. c. 62	Statutory Declarations Act 1835	The Statutory Declarations Act 1835.	In section 14, the words " or bank post bill ".
7 & 8 Vict. c. 32	Bank Charter Act 1844	The Bank Charter Act 1844.	In section 1, the words from " subject to the rules " onwards. Section 26.
16 & 17 Vict. c. 2	Bank Notes Act 1852	The Bank Notes Act 1852.	In section 1, the words " bank post bills ", wherever occurring.
19 & 20 Vict. c. 100	Joint Stock Banks Act 1856	An Act to amend the law with respect to the election of directors of joint stock banks in England.	The whole act.
27 & 28 Vict. c. 78	Bank Notes (Ireland) Act 1864	The Bank Notes (Ireland) Act 1864.	In the preamble, the words " bank post bills " in both places. In section 1, the words " bank post bills ", wherever occurring.
32 & 33 Vict. c. 24	Newspapers, Printers and Reading Rooms Repeal Act 1869	The Newspapers, Printers and Reading Rooms Repeal Act 1869.	In Schedule 2, in the entry relating to 51 Geo. 3. c. 65, the words " or bank post bill ".
3 & 4 Geo. 5. c. 27	Forgery Act 1913	The Forgery Act 1913.	In section 18(1), in the definition of " bank note ", the words " bank post bill " and the words " and ' blank bank post bill ' ".
18 & 19 Geo. 5. c. 13	Currency and Bank Notes Act 1928	The Currency and Bank Notes Act 1928.	In section 3(3), the words from " but shall not be required " onwards.
2 & 3 Eliz. 2. c. 12	Currency and Bank Notes Act 1954	The Currency and Bank Notes Act 1954.	Section 4(2).
1968 c. 13	National Loans Act 1968	The National Loans Act 1968.	In section 12(7), the words from " and section 1 " onwards.
1969 c. 48	Post Office Act 1969	The Post Office Act 1969.	In Schedule 6, in Part III, the entries relating to sections 21, 54 and 56 of the Trustee Savings Banks Act 1954.
Act of Parliament of Ireland
39 Geo. 3. c. 63 (I)	Bank of England Act (Ireland) 1799	The Bank of England Act (Ireland) 1799.	The whole act.

==== Part V: Criminal law enactments ====
Part V — Criminal law enactments
Citation	Short title	Extent of repeal
1 Geo. 1. St. 2. c. 5	Riot Act	The whole act.
20 Geo. 2. c. 30	Treason Act 1746	The whole act.
25 Geo. 2. c. 37	Murder Act 1751	The whole act.
52 Geo. 3. c. 130	Malicious Damage Act 1812	The whole act.
52 Geo. 3. c. 156	Prisoners of War (Escape) Act 1812	The whole act.
54 Geo. 3. c. 146	Treason Act 1814	Section 2.
56 Geo. 3. c. 125	Malicious Damage (Scotland) Act 1816	The whole act.
56 Geo. 3. c. 138	Pillory Abolition Act 1816	The whole act.
58 Geo. 3. c. 29	Fees for Pardons Act 1818	The whole act.
6 Geo. 4. c. 47	Leasing-making (Scotland) Act 1825	The whole act.
7 & 8 Geo. 4. c. 20	Fraudulent Bankrupts (Scotland) Act 1827	The whole act.
10 Geo. 4. c. 38	Criminal Law (Scotland) Act 1829	The whole act.
36 & 37 Vict. c. 60	Extradition Act 1873	In the Schedule, in the entry relating to the Theft Act 1968, the words " which is not included in the First Schedule to the principal Act ".
2 & 3 Geo. 6. c. 50	Prevention of Violence (Temporary Provisions) Act 1939	The whole act.
3 & 4 Geo. 6. c. 21	Treachery Act 1940	The whole act.
5 & 6 Eliz. 2. c. 11	Homicide Act 1957	Section 14.
1965 c. 71	Murder (Abolition of Death Penalty) Act 1965	Section 4.
1967 c. 77	Police (Scotland) Act 1967	In section 52(1), the proviso. In Schedule 4, the entry relating to the Homicide Act 1957.
1968 c. 19	Criminal Appeal Act 1968	Section 52(2). In Schedule 5, Part II.

==== Part VI: Highway and traffic law enactments ====
Part VI — Highway and traffic law enactments
Citation	Short title	Description	Extent of repeal
22 Cha. 2. c. 12	Bridges Act 1670	The Bridges Act 1670.	The whole act.
53 Geo. 3. c. 117	Bridges (Scotland) Act 1813	The Bridges (Scotland) Act 1813.	The whole act.
1 & 2 Will. 4. c. 22	London Hackney Carriage Act 1831	The London Hackney Carriage Act 1831.	Section 37. Sections 43 to 45. Sections 59 and 60.
5 & 6 Will. 4. c. 50	Highway Act 1835	The Highway Act 1835.	Sections 50 and 76. In section 78, the words from " or if any person ", where first occurring, to " principal owners of such waggon, cart or carriage ".
2 & 3 Vict. c. 47	Metropolitan Police Act 1839	The Metropolitan Police Act 1839.	Section 51. In section 54, in paragraph 9, the words " during the time of divine service, and ". Sections 56 and 59.
6 & 7 Vict. c. 86	London Hackney Carriages Act 1843	The London Hackney Carriages Act 1843.	Sections 4 and 32.
10 & 11 Vict. c. 89	Town Police Clauses Act 1847	The Town Police Clauses Act 1847.	Section 22, including that section as incorporated in any other Act.
16 & 17 Vict. c. 33	London Hackney Carriage Act 1853	The London Hackney Carriage Act 1853.	Sections 4 to 6. In section 7, the proviso. In section 10, the words from " without " onwards. In section 17, the words from " as set forth " to " annexed ". Schedule (A).
16 & 17 Vict. c. 127	London Hackney Carriage (No. 2) Act 1853	The London Hackney Carriage (No. 2) Act 1853.	Sections 13 to 15.
24 & 25 Vict. c. 69	Tramways (Scotland) Act 1861	The Tramways (Scotland) Act 1861.	The whole act.
27 & 28 Vict. c. 88	Westminster Bridge Act 1864	An Act for the better regulation of the traffic on Westminster Bridge and for the prevention of obstructions thereon.	The whole act.
28 & 29 Vict. c. 56	Trespass (Scotland) Act 1865	The Trespass (Scotland) Act 1865.	In section 3, the words from " turnpike " to " other ".
30 & 31 Vict. c. 134	Metropolitan Streets Act 1867	The Metropolitan Streets Act 1867.	In section 4, the definition of " the special limits of this Act ". Sections 8 and 26.
32 & 33 Vict. c. 115	Metropolitan Public Carriage Act 1869	The Metropolitan Public Carriage Act 1869.	In section 9(3), the proviso.
41 & 42 Vict. c. 51	Roads and Bridges (Scotland) Act 1878	The Roads and Bridges (Scotland) Act 1878.	In section 3, the definition of " tolls ". Sections 32, 37, 39 and 40. In section 44, the words from " and the price " onwards. Sections 53, 56, 69, 70, 75, 87 to 90, 93, 96, 98, 99, 113, 119 and 121.
43 Vict. c. 7	Roads Amendment Act 1880	The Roads Amendment Act 1880.	The whole act.
45 & 46 Vict. c. 27	Highway Rate Assessment and Expenditure Act 1882	The Highway Rate Assessment and Expenditure Act 1882.	The whole act.
48 & 49 Vict. c. 61	Secretary for Scotland Act 1885	The Secretary for Scotland Act 1885.	In the Schedule, in Part I, the entry relating to Roads and Bridges.
7 Edw. 7. c. 55	London Cab and Stage Carriage Act 1907	The London Cab and Stage Carriage Act 1907.	In section 1(1), the proviso.
15 & 16 Geo. 5. c. 68	Roads Improvement Act 1925	The Roads Improvement Act 1925.	Section 9(2).
1 Edw. 8 & 1 Geo. 6. c. 5	Trunk Roads Act 1936	The Trunk Roads Act 1936.	Section 6(5). Section 12(3) and (16).
9 & 10 Geo. 6. c. 30	Trunk Roads Act 1946	The Trunk Roads Act 1946.	Section 9(1) and (2).
8 & 9 Eliz. 2. c. 16	Road Traffic Act 1960	The Road Traffic Act 1960.	In section 150(1), the words from " sections " to " 1867 ".

The repeal by the act of section 88 of the Roads and Bridges (Scotland) Act 1878 does not affect any agreement which, immediately before the repeal takes effect, was in force by virtue of paragraph (1) of that section.

==== Part VII: Enactments relating to overseas territories ====
Part VII — Enactments relating to overseas territories
Citation	Short title	Description	Extent of repeal
14 Geo. 3. c. 88	Quebec Revenue Act 1774	An Act to establish a fund towards further defraying the charges of the administration of justice and support of the civil government within the province of Quebec in America.	The whole act.
18 Geo. 3. c. 12	Taxation of Colonies Act 1778	The Taxation of Colonies Act 1778.	The whole act.
1 & 2 Geo. 4. c. 121	Commissariat Accounts Act 1821	The Commissariat Accounts Act 1821.	The whole act.
6 Geo. 4. c. 87	Consular Advances Act 1825	The Consular Advances Act 1825.	The whole act.
1 & 2 Vict. c. 67	West Indian Prisons Act 1838	The West Indian Prisons Act 1838.	The whole act.
24 & 25 Vict. c. 11	Foreign Law Ascertainment Act 1861	The Foreign Law Ascertainment Act 1861.	The whole act.
26 & 27 Vict. c. 35	South Africa Offences Act 1863	The South Africa Offences Act 1863.	The whole act.
26 & 27 Vict. c. 76	Colonial Letters Patent Act 1863	The Colonial Letters Patent Act 1863.	The whole act.
27 & 28 Vict. c. 62	Isle of Man Harbours Amendment Act 1864	The Isle of Man Harbours Amendment Act 1864.	The whole act.
28 & 29 Vict. c. 28	Isle of Man Compensation Act 1865	An Act to authorise certain payments out of the land revenues of the Crown to provide compensation for certain claims in the Isle of Man.	The whole act.
36 & 37 Vict. c. 22	Australian Colonies Duties Act 1873	The Australian Colonies Duties Act 1873.	The whole act.
37 & 38 Vict. c. 38	Straits Settlements Offences Act 1874	The Straits Settlements Offences Act 1874.	The whole act.
38 & 39 Vict. c. 51	Pacific Islanders Protection Act 1875	The Pacific Islanders Protection Act 1875.	Schedules A and B.
38 & 39 Vict. c. 53	Canada Copyright Act 1875	The Canada Copyright Act 1875.	The whole act.
40 & 41 Vict. c. 47	South Africa Act 1877	The South Africa Act 1877.	The whole act.
53 & 54 Vict. c. 37	Foreign Jurisdiction Act 1890	The Foreign Jurisdiction Act 1890.	Sections 14, 15 and 17. In Schedule 1, the entry relating to the Foreign Law Ascertainment Act 1861. Schedule 2.
54 & 55 Vict. c. 36	Consular Salaries and Fees Act 1891	The Consular Salaries and Fees Act 1891.	Section 4. The Schedule.
56 & 57 Vict. c. 5	Regimental Debts Act 1893	The Regimental Debts Act 1893.	In section 16, the words " or India ". In section 29, in the definition of " representation ", the words " India or ", wherever occurring, and, in the definition of " official administrator ", the words " means in India the administrator-general of any province, and ".
57 & 58 Vict. c. 17	Colonial Officers (Leave of Absence) Act 1894	The Colonial Officers (Leave of Absence) Act 1894.	The whole act.
58 & 59 Vict. c. 3	Australian Colonies Duties Act 1895	The Australian Colonies Duties Act 1895.	The whole act.
15 & 16 Geo. 5. c. 9	Anglo-Italian Treaty (East African Territories) Act 1925	The Anglo-Italian Treaty (East African Territories) Act 1925.	The whole act.
18 & 19 Geo. 5. c. 23	Straits Settlements and Johore Territorial Waters (Agreement) Act 1928	The Straits Settlements and Johore Territorial Waters (Agreement) Act 1928.	The whole act.
24 & 25 Geo. 5. c. 55	Dindings Agreement (Approval) Act 1934	The Dindings Agreement (Approval) Act 1934.	The whole act.
2 & 3 Geo. 6. c. 86	Isle of Man (War Legislation) Act 1939	The Isle of Man (War Legislation) Act 1939.	The whole act.
4 & 5 Geo. 6. c. 35	Colonial War Risks Insurance (Guarantees) Act 1941	The Colonial War Risks Insurance (Guarantees) Act 1941.	The whole act.
10 & 11 Geo. 6. c. 9	Malta (Reconstruction) Act 1947	The Malta (Reconstruction) Act 1947.	The whole act.
9 & 10 Eliz. 2. c. 23	Republic of South Africa (Temporary Provisions) Act 1961	The Republic of South Africa (Temporary Provisions) Act 1961.	The whole act.

==== Part VIII: Enactments relating to agriculture ====
Part VIII — Enactments relating to agriculture
Citation	Short title	Extent of repeal
39 & 40 Geo. 3. c. 81	Hop Trade Act 1800	The whole act.
29 & 30 Vict. c. 37	Hop (Prevention of Frauds) Act 1866	Sections 4 and 6.
8 Edw. 7. c. 36	Small Holdings and Allotments Act 1908	Section 51.
1 & 2 Geo. 5. c. 49	Small Landholders (Scotland) Act 1911	In Schedule 1, the entries relating to the Sale of Food and Drugs Acts 1875 to 1907, the Merchandize Marks (Prosecutions) Act 1894, the Fertilisers and Feeding Stuffs Act 1906, the Agricultural Holdings (Scotland) Acts 1908 and 1910 and the Housing and Town Planning Act 1909.
6 & 7 Geo. 5. c. 38	Small Holding Colonies Act 1916	In section 1(3), the words from the beginning to " acres in all, and ". Section 4(1)(b). Section 7. In section 8(1), the words from " and the expression " onwards. In section 9, the words from " and section " to " 1843 ". In section 11(a), the words " ' arbiter ' shall be substituted for ' arbitrator ', ' the Agricultural Holdings (Scotland) Act, 1908 ' shall be substituted for ' the Agricultural Holdings Act, 1908 ' ". In section 11(b), the words " Paragraph (b) of " and the words " four and sections seven and ". Section 12(2).
10 & 11 Geo. 5. c. 54	Seeds Act 1920	In section 12(1), the words " and the Department of Agriculture and Technical Instruction for Ireland " and " and Ireland ". In section 13, the words " or the Department of Agriculture and Technical Instruction for Ireland ". Section 16.
12 & 13 Geo. 5. c. 51	Allotments Act 1922	Section 2(10).
13 & 14 Geo. 5. c. 34	Agricultural Credits Act 1923	Section 3(4) as it applies to England and Wales. Section 4. In section 5(a), the words " the Agricultural Credits (Scotland) Account shall be substituted for the Agricultural Credits Account ". The Schedule.
16 & 17 Geo. 5. c. 52	Small Holdings and Allotments Act 1926	In section 17(3)(b), the words " and (6) ". Section 22(1). In Schedule 1, the entries relating to section 50 of the Small Holdings and Allotments Act 1908 and to sections 16(3) and 18 of the Land Settlement (Facilities) Act 1919. Schedule 2.
18 & 19 Geo. 5. c. 19	Agricultural Produce (Grading and Marking) Act 1928	In section 3, the words from " after " to " twenty-nine ".
21 & 22 Geo. 5. c. 41	Agricultural Land (Utilisation) Act 1931	Sections 8 to 10. In section 11(1), the words " small holdings or ", wherever occurring. In section 11(2), the words " small holdings ". In section 11(3), the words " in relation to a small holding or to land acquired for a small holding, the council of the county, and, ". Section 14(5). Section 16(3). Section 17(2). In section 19, the words " of sections five, six and seven of this Act, and, ". In section 23, the words " one, two, ten and ". Section 24(g) and (h). Section 24(k) except the words " sections twelve and seventeen shall not apply ".
21 & 22 Geo. 5. c. 44	Small Landholders and Agricultural Holdings (Scotland) Act 1931	Section 41. Schedule 1.
24 & 25 Geo. 5. c. 51	Milk Act 1934	Section 10(3).
1 Edw. 8 & 1 Geo. 6. c. 70	Agriculture Act 1937	Section 17. In section 32, in the definition of " Approved supplier ", the words " or basic slag ".
2 & 3 Geo. 6. c. 48	Agricultural Development Act 1939	In section 38(1), in the definition of " the appropriate Minister ", the words " and in relation to Northern Ireland or functions exercisable in respect thereto ".
3 & 4 Geo. 6. c. 14	Agriculture (Miscellaneous War Provisions) Act 1940	Section 14. Sections 16 to 21. Section 22(1)(b). Section 22(3) and (4). Sections 23 to 26. In section 27(1)(a), the words " or basic slag ". Section 30(1) and (2)(a). Section 31(1) except paragraph (d). Section 31(2), (3) and (5). In section 32(1), the words from " and sections " to " this Act " and the words from " and, in " onwards. Section 32(2) to (4). Schedule 5.
3 & 4 Geo. 6. c. 50	Agriculture (Miscellaneous War Provisions) (No. 2) Act 1940	Section 2(1)(a). Section 2(2) to (7). Section 2(11) and (12). In section 2(13), the definition of " owner ". Sections 5 to 9. In section 10(4), the words " except section six thereof ".
4 & 5 Geo. 6. c. 50	Agriculture (Miscellaneous Provisions) Act 1941	Sections 4 to 6. Sections 9 and 10. Section 12(2), (3), (5), (6), (7) and (9). Section 13(2). In section 15, the definitions of " the Committee ", " the rules of good husbandry ", " occupation contract " and " the war period ". Schedules 1, 2 and 4.
6 & 7 Geo. 6. c. 16	Agriculture (Miscellaneous Provisions) Act 1943	In section 3(2), the words " section fourteen or " and the words from " or under " onwards. Sections 5 and 6. Section 10(1), (2) and (4). Sections 11 to 14. Section 15(2) and (4). Section 16. In section 19(a), the words from " for any reference to the National Trust " to " 1935 ", the words from " the expression ' the Committee ' " to " owner "; and the words from " for any reference to a mortgage " onwards. Section 19(c), (d)(ii) and (iv) and (e). Section 20(2). In section 20(3), the words from " or under " onwards. In section 22, the words " twelve and thirteen " and the words from " and, in the application " onwards. Schedules 1 and 2.
7 & 8 Geo. 6. c. 28	Agriculture (Miscellaneous Provisions) Act 1944	Section 7. In section 9, the words from " except " to " lime ".
9 & 10 Geo. 6. c. 29	Agriculture (Artificial Insemination) Act 1946	Sections 2 to 4. In section 6, the definitions of " Cattle insemination centre " and " Licence ".
10 & 11 Geo. 6. c. 32	Agriculture (Emergency Payments) Act 1947	The whole act.
10 & 11 Geo. 6. c. 48	Agriculture Act 1947	Section 85. Section 92(3). Section 97(2). In section 103(1) and (3), the words " goods and ". Section 103(2).
11 & 12 Geo. 6. c. 45	Agriculture (Scotland) Act 1948	Sections 8, 25, 58, 62 and 74. In section 75(1) and (3), the words " goods and ". Section 75(2).
12, 13 & 14 Geo. 6. c. 37	Agriculture (Miscellaneous Provisions) Act 1949	Sections 1 to 5. Sections 9 and 14. Section 15(1). In section 15(3), the words " any other section of ". In section 16(1), the words from the beginning to " section fourteen of this Act ".
12, 13 & 14 Geo. 6. c. 75	Agricultural Holdings (Scotland) Act 1949	In Schedule 8, in the entry relating to Part I of the Agriculture (Scotland) Act 1948, the words from " except section eight " to " by this Act ".
14 Geo. 6. c. 31	Allotments Act 1950	Section 1(2). Section 2(2). Section 3(5). Section 12(2). Section 15(3). The Schedule.
2 & 3 Eliz. 2. c. 39	Agriculture (Miscellaneous Provisions) Act 1954	Section 13. In section 16, the words " and section twelve ". Section 17(2). Schedule 3.
2 & 3 Eliz. 2. c. 68	Pests Act 1954	In section 8(1), the words " after the appointed day ". Section 8(6). In section 8(7), the words from " (other " to " subsection) ". Section 15(2). The Schedule.
5 & 6 Eliz. 2. c. 57	Agriculture Act 1957	In section 8(2), the words from " after " to " sixty and " and the word " thereafter ". Section 10. Section 36(1) and (4). Schedule 4.
6 & 7 Eliz. 2. c. 71	Agriculture Act 1958	Section 6(4) and (5). Section 10(1) and (6). Schedules 2 and 3.
8 & 9 Eliz. 2. c. 22	Horticulture Act 1960	In section 3, the words " or (2) ", wherever occurring. Section 8(3) and (4). Sections 9 to 12. In section 13(2), the words from " (including " onwards. In section 15(2)(b), the word " of ", where first occurring, and the words from " one " to " remainder ". Section 16. Section 17(1). In section 17(3)(a), the words " Council or ". Section 17(3)(b). In section 17(3)(c), the words " in the case of the organisation, for ". In section 18, the definitions of " the Council " and " preparation for market ". Section 19. In Schedule 1, in paragraph 1, the words " the Horticultural Marketing Council or ". Schedule 2.
1963 c. 11	Agriculture (Miscellaneous Provisions) Act 1963	Section 11. In section 12(1), (2) and (3), the words " or section 11 ". In section 16(4), the words " column 1 of ", the words from " shall not " to " such fee " and column 2 of the Table. Section 16(7). In section 16(8), the words " subsection (1) or ". Section 18. Section 28. In section 29(3) and (4) the reference to section 18(1). The Schedule.

==== Part IX: Enactments relating to land acquisition powers ====
Part IX — Enactments relating to land acquisition powers
Citation	Short title	Extent of repeal
5 & 6 Vict. c. 94	Defence Act 1842	In sections 10 and 18, as they apply to Scotland, the words from " femes covert " to " 1960, or ".
55 & 56 Vict. c. 43	Military Lands Act 1892	Section 9. In section 24, the words from " Provided also " onwards.
6 & 7 Geo. 5. c. 63	Defence of the Realm (Acquisition of Land) Act 1916	Section 10(c), (d) and (f). Section 12(4).
26 Geo. 5 & 1 Edw. 8. c. 44	Air Navigation Act 1936	Section 26(1). Schedule 4.
2 & 3 Geo. 6. c. 75	Compensation (Defence) Act 1939	In section 2(1), the words from " Provided that " onwards. In section 17(1), in the definition of " emergency powers ", paragraph (b) except the word " or ".
8 & 9 Geo. 6. c. 43	Requisitioned Land and War Works Act 1945	Section 21. In section 33(1), the words " otherwise than by virtue of Part II of this Act " and the words from " where the " to " period ". In section 33(2), the words " otherwise than by virtue of Part II of this Act ". In section 34(1), the words from the beginning to " this Act ". In section 34(2), the words from " and either " to " this Act ". Sections 40 to 43. Sections 45, 46 and 54. In section 60(3), the words from the beginning to " section thirty-one of that Act " and the words from " for any reference to a local education authority " to " authority ".
9 & 10 Geo. 6. c. 49	Acquisition of Land (Authorisation Procedure) Act 1946	In section 3(1)(a), the words " or an authorisation given under section two thereof ". In section 3(1)(b), the words " or authorisation ". In Schedule 4, the entries relating to the following enactments, namely, sections 193, 262 and 315 of the Burgh Police (Scotland) Act 1892, the Burgh Police (Scotland) Act 1903, the Mental Deficiency and Lunacy (Scotland) Act 1913, the Education (Scotland) Act 1918, the Housing (Scotland) Act 1930, the Town and Country Planning Act 1932, the Air Navigation Act 1936, the Fire Brigades Act 1938, the Housing (Temporary Provisions) Act 1944, the Housing (Scotland) Act 1944 and sections 26 and 27 of the Requisitioned Land and War Works Act 1945.
10 & 11 Geo. 6. c. 22	Civic Restaurants Act 1947	Section 2(2).
10 & 11 Geo. 6. c. 42	Acquisition of Land (Authorisation Procedure) (Scotland) Act 1947	In section 3(1)(a), the words " or an authorisation given under section two thereof ". In section 3(1)(b), the words " or authorisation ".
11 & 12 Geo. 6. c. 17	Requisitioned Land and War Works Act 1948	Sections 1 and 2. Section 3(2). Section 4(1). In section 4(2), the words " otherwise than by virtue of the said Part II ". Section 5. Section 9. Section 10(1), (2) and (5). Section 11(1). Section 18(6). In section 20(3), the definition of " the Transitional Powers Act ". In the Schedule, paragraph 7.
12, 13 & 14 Geo. 6. c. 36	War Damage (Public Utility Undertakings, &c.) Act 1949	Section 23.
12, 13 & 14 Geo. 6. c. 67	Civil Aviation Act 1949	Section 68. In Schedule 1, paragraph 10. In Schedule 2, paragraph 2. In Schedule 3, paragraph 4. In Schedule 11, in paragraph 3, the words " and twenty-six ".
12, 13 & 14 Geo. 6. c. 84	War Damaged Sites Act 1949	Section 8(1).
1 & 2 Eliz. 2. c. 47	Emergency Laws (Miscellaneous Provisions) Act 1953	In Schedule 1, paragraphs 6 and 7.
2 & 3 Eliz. 2. c. 72	Town and Country Planning Act 1954	Section 53(3).
2 & 3 Eliz. 2. c. 73	Town and Country Planning (Scotland) Act 1954	Section 55(3).
3 & 4 Eliz. 2. c. 24	Requisitioned Houses and Housing (Amendment) Act 1955	Section 2(2) and (5)(b).
8 & 9 Eliz. 2. c. 61	Mental Health (Scotland) Act 1960	In Schedule 4, the entry relating to the Defence Act 1842.
1965 c. 56	Compulsory Purchase Act 1965	Section 9(6). Section 25(4). In Schedule 2, paragraph 3(2). In Schedule 3, paragraph 4(5).

In column 3 of this part of the schedule any reference to an enactment includes a reference to it as applied by or under any other enactment.

==== Part X: Enactments relating to the coal industry ====
Part X — Enactments relating to the coal industry
Citation	Short title	Extent of repeal
10 & 11 Geo. 5. c. 50	Mining Industry Act 1920	Schedule 2.
1 Edw. 8 & 1 Geo. 6. c. 56	Coal (Registration of Ownership) Act 1937	The whole act.
1 & 2 Geo. 6. c. 52	Coal Act 1938	Section 1. Section 3(1). In section 3(2), the words " During the period between " and the words from " all coal " onwards. Section 3(3). Section 4. Section 6 except subsection (2). Sections 7 to 10. Sections 12, 13, 17(3), 18, 20 and 21. Sections 23 to 31. Sections 35 to 40. Section 42(2). In section 42(3), the words " and in the said Table " and the words from " and ' private ' " onwards. Section 43(3). In section 43(4), the words " and the Fourth and Fifth Schedules to this Act ". Section 45(9), (10) and (11). Sections 56 and 57. Schedules 1, 3, 4 and 5.
5 & 6 Geo. 6. c. 19	Coal (Concurrent Leases) Act 1942	The whole act.
6 & 7 Geo. 6. c. 38	Coal Act 1943	Sections 4 to 6. Sections 8 to 10. Sections 12, 13, 15 and 16. Schedules 1 and 3.
9 & 10 Geo. 6. c. 59	Coal Industry Nationalisation Act 1946	Section 5(4). Sections 10 to 25. In section 28(1), paragraph (a). In section 38(3), paragraph (a), the words from " subsection (6) " to " and in ", the words " six, seven and " and the words from " section thirty-nine " to " Fifth Schedule ". Section 38(5). In section 55, the words from " and subsection (7) " onwards. Section 64(5). In Schedule 3, paragraphs 7 and 13.
14 Geo. 6. c. 23	Coal-Mining (Subsidence) Act 1950	The whole act.
14 & 15 Geo. 6. c. 41	Coal Industry Act 1951	The whole act.
5 & 6 Eliz. 2. c. 59	Coal-Mining (Subsidence) Act 1957	Section 8. In section 18(2), the words from " and the " onwards.

==== Part XI: Enactments relating to public schools ====
Part XI — Enactments relating to public schools
Citation	Short title	Extent of repeal
31 & 32 Vict. c. 118	Public Schools Act 1868	In section 5, the words from the beginning to " Special Commissioners herein-after mentioned ". Section 6. In section 8(2), the words from " two months " onwards. In section 8(3), the words from " two months " to " Special Commissioners ". In section 9, the words from " be submitted " to " approved by them, ". In section 10, the words " of the Special Commissioners and " and the words from " so that such statutes " onwards. In section 11, the words from " after the expiration " to " Special Commissioners ", where first occurring, and the words from " with the exception " to " Special Commissioners ", where last occurring. Sections 14, 22 and 24. In section 26, the words from " Provided firstly " onwards. In section 32, the words from " Provided firstly " onwards.
36 & 37 Vict. c. 62	Public Schools (Eton College Property) Act 1873	The whole act.

The repeal by the act of words in section 5 and of sections 6 and 24 of the Public Schools Act 1868 does not affect any statute or scheme which, immediately before the repeal takes effect, was in force by virtue of any of those sections.

==== Part XII: Enactments relating to legal aid ====
Part XII — Enactments relating to legal aid
Citation	Short title	Description	Extent of repeal
11 Hen. 7. c. 12	Suing in Forma Pauperis Act 1495	An Acte to admytt such persons as are poore to sue in forma pauperis.	The whole act.
56 & 57 Vict. c. 22	Appeal (Forma Pauperis) Act 1893	The Appeal (Forma Pauperis) Act 1893.	The whole act.
7 Edw. 7. c. 51	Sheriff Courts (Scotland) Act 1907	The Sheriff Courts (Scotland) Act 1907.	Section 51. In Schedule 1, rules 152 to 169.
12, 13 & 14 Geo. 6. c. 51	Legal Aid and Advice Act 1949	The Legal Aid and Advice Act 1949.	In section 17(3), the words from " and accordingly " onwards.
Acts of Parliament of Scotland
1424 (c. 24)	Poor's Counsel Act 1424	Anent billis of complayntis.	The whole act.
1587 (c. 57)	Criminal Justice Act 1587	The Criminal Justice Act 1587.	In section (10), the words from " And that all and quhatsumeuir liegis " to the end of the section.

==== Part XIII: Miscellaneous enactments ====
Part XIII — Miscellaneous enactments
Citation	Short title	Description	Extent of repeal
24 Hen. 8. c. 16	Butchers of London Act 1532	An Acte licensyng the bochers of London to kyll theyr cattell within the walls of the same cytie.	The whole act.
6 Ann. c. 11	Union with Scotland Act 1706	The Union with Scotland Act 1706.	In article VI, the words from " And that from and after " onwards. Article IX. In article XIX, the words from " And that all admiralty jurisdictions " to " proper to be made by the Parliament of Great Britain " and the words from " And that there be a Court of Exchequer " onwards.
10 Geo. 4. c. 7	Roman Catholic Relief Act 1829	The Roman Catholic Relief Act 1829.	In section 5, the words from " and also to vote " to " such representative peers ".
17 & 18 Vict. c. 112	Literary and Scientific Institutions Act 1854	The Literary and Scientific Institutions Act 1854.	In section 33, the words from " and the London Institution " to " Knowledge ".
23 & 24 Vict. c. 66	Medical Act 1860	The Medical Act 1860.	Section 1. In section 5, the words from " but this repeal " to " letters testimonial " and the words from " and the office " onwards.
24 & 25 Vict. c. 78	Annoyance Jurors (Westminster) Act 1861	An Act to repeal certain enactments relating to nominating and appointing the householders of Westminster to serve as annoyance jurors, and to make other provisions in lieu thereof.	The whole act.
32 & 33 Vict. c. 31	Oyster and Mussel Fisheries Orders Confirmation Act 1869 (No. 2)	The Oyster and Mussel Fisheries Orders Confirmation Act 1869 (No. 2).	The whole act.
34 & 35 Vict. c. 50	Bankruptcy Disqualification Act 1871	The Bankruptcy Disqualification Act 1871.	In section 2, the words from " and further " onwards. In section 4, the words from " and if a peer " to " that House ". Section 5.
38 & 39 Vict. c. 21	Public Entertainments Act 1875	The Public Entertainments Act 1875.	The whole act.
38 & 39 Vict. c. 90	Employers and Workmen Act 1875	The Employers and Workmen Act 1875.	The whole act as it applies to Great Britain.
41 & 42 Vict. c. 15	Customs and Inland Revenue Act 1878	The Customs and Inland Revenue Act 1878.	The whole act.
43 & 44 Vict. c. 16	Merchant Seamen (Payment of Wages and Rating) Act 1880	The Merchant Seamen (Payment of Wages and Rating) Act 1880.	The whole act as it applies to Great Britain.
45 & 46 Vict. c. 72	Revenue, Friendly Societies and National Debt Act 1882	The Revenue, Friendly Societies and National Debt Act 1882.	Section 6.
46 & 47 Vict. c. 52	Bankruptcy Act 1883	The Bankruptcy Act 1883.	In section 32(1)(a), the words from " or being elected " onwards.
47 & 48 Vict. c. 17	Metropolitan Police Act 1884	The Metropolitan Police Act 1884.	The whole act.
53 & 54 Vict. c. 25	Barracks Act 1890	The Barracks Act 1890.	Section 10, including that section as applied by the Air Force (Application of Enactments) (No. 1) Order 1918.
54 & 55 Vict. c. 13	Taxes (Regulation of Remuneration) Act 1891	The Taxes (Regulation of Remuneration) Act 1891.	The whole act.
62 & 63 Vict. c. 7	Metropolis Water Act 1899	The Metropolis Water Act 1899.	The whole act.
2 Edw. 7. c. 13	Labour Bureaux (London) Act 1902	The Labour Bureaux (London) Act 1902.	The whole act.
4 Edw. 7. c. 13	London Electric Lighting Areas Act 1904	The London Electric Lighting Areas Act 1904.	The whole act.
4 Edw. 7. c. 24	Wireless Telegraphy Act 1904	The Wireless Telegraphy Act 1904.	The whole act.
1 & 2 Geo. 5. c. 2	Revenue Act 1911	The Revenue Act 1911.	The whole act, except section 10 as that section applies to Northern Ireland.
1 & 2 Geo. 5. c. 48	Finance Act 1911	The Finance Act 1911.	Section 21. Section 22(2).
2 & 3 Geo. 5. c. 13	London Institution (Transfer) Act 1912	The London Institution (Transfer) Act 1912.	The whole act.
6 & 7 Geo. 5. c. 31	Police, Factories, &c. (Miscellaneous Provisions) Act 1916	The Police, Factories, &c. (Miscellaneous Provisions) Act 1916.	Section 3.
7 & 8 Geo. 5. c. 31	Finance Act 1917	The Finance Act 1917.	Section 35(4).
7 & 8 Geo. 5. c. 36	Police Constables (Naval and Military Service) Act 1917	The Police Constables (Naval and Military Service) Act 1917.	The whole act, including that act as applied by the Air Force (Application of Enactments) (No. 2) Order 1918.
15 & 16 Geo. 5. c. 2	Canals (Continuance of Charging Powers) Act 1924	The Canals (Continuance of Charging Powers) Act 1924.	The whole act.
15 & 16 Geo. 5. c. 28	Administration of Justice Act 1925	The Administration of Justice Act 1925.	In section 28, the words " the Lord Chief Justice or the President ", wherever occurring, and the words " as the case may be ". Section 29(2).
15 & 16 Geo. 5. c. 67	Wireless Telegraphy (Explanation) Act 1925	The Wireless Telegraphy (Explanation) Act 1925.	The whole act.
16 & 17 Geo. 5. c. 54	Wireless Telegraphy (Blind Persons Facilities) Act 1926	The Wireless Telegraphy (Blind Persons Facilities) Act 1926.	The whole act.
20 & 21 Geo. 5. c. 7	Development (Loan Guarantees and Grants) Act 1929	The Development (Loan Guarantees and Grants) Act 1929.	The whole act.
2 & 3 Geo. 6. c. 22	Camps Act 1939	The Camps Act 1939.	The whole act as it applies to England and Wales.
2 & 3 Geo. 6. c. 114	Execution of Trusts (Emergency Provisions) Act 1939	The Execution of Trusts (Emergency Provisions) Act 1939.	The whole act.
3 & 4 Geo. 6. c. 38	Truck Act 1940	The Truck Act 1940.	Section 1(1) and (3). Section 2. In section 3(2), the words from " Save " to " section ".
3 & 4 Geo. 6. c. 41	Confirmation of Executors (War Service) (Scotland) Act 1940	The Confirmation of Executors (War Service) (Scotland) Act 1940.	The whole act.
4 & 5 Geo. 6. c. 7	Diplomatic Privileges (Extension) Act 1941	The Diplomatic Privileges (Extension) Act 1941.	The whole act.
4 & 5 Geo. 6. c. 12	War Damage Act 1941	The War Damage Act 1941.	Section 88.
4 & 5 Geo. 6. c. 36	Financial Powers (U.S.A. Securities) Act 1941	The Financial Powers (U.S.A. Securities) Act 1941.	The whole act.
7 & 8 Geo. 6. c. 8	Guardianship (Refugee Children) Act 1944	The Guardianship (Refugee Children) Act 1944.	The whole act.
8 & 9 Geo. 6. c. 26	Camps Act 1945	The Camps Act 1945.	The whole act.
9 & 10 Geo. 6. c. 26	Emergency Laws (Transitional Provisions) Act 1946	The Emergency Laws (Transitional Provisions) Act 1946.	In section 16, the words " or under Regulation fifty B of the Defence (General) Regulations 1939 ".
9 & 10 Geo. 6. c. 52	Trade Disputes and Trade Unions Act 1946	The Trade Disputes and Trade Unions Act 1946.	In section 1, the words from " subject to " to " to this Act ". The Schedule.
10 & 11 Geo. 6. c. 26	Cotton (Centralised Buying) Act 1947	The Cotton (Centralised Buying) Act 1947.	The whole act.
10 & 11 Geo. 6. c. 43	Local Government (Scotland) Act 1947	The Local Government (Scotland) Act 1947.	Section 377(7).
11 & 12 Geo. 6. c. 20	Supreme Court of Judicature (Amendment) Act 1948	The Supreme Court of Judicature (Amendment) Act 1948.	The whole act.
2 & 3 Eliz. 2. c. 24	Cotton Act 1954	The Cotton Act 1954.	The whole act.
2 & 3 Eliz. 2. c. 50	Housing (Repairs and Rents) (Scotland) Act 1954	The Housing (Repairs and Rents) (Scotland) Act 1954.	Sections 12, 15, 40 and 43. Section 44(2) and (3). Schedule 4.
3 & 4 Eliz. 2. c. 2	Wireless Telegraphy (Validation of Charges) Act 1954	The Wireless Telegraphy (Validation of Charges) Act 1954.	The whole act.
5 & 6 Eliz. 2. c. 20	House of Commons Disqualification Act 1957	The House of Commons Disqualification Act 1957.	Section 14(1) and (2). In Part I of Schedule 1, the words " Umpire or Deputy Umpire appointed for the purposes of the Old Age Pensions Act (Northern Ireland) 1936 ". In Part II of Schedule 1, the words " The Consumer Council ", the words " The Iron and Steel Holding and Realisation Agency " and the words " The Sites Commission constituted under the Industries Development Act (Northern Ireland) 1945 ". In Part III of Schedule 1, in the entry beginning " Chairman or Reserve Chairman of a Local Tribunal constituted for the purposes of the National Insurance Act 1965 " the words " or the National Insurance (Industrial Injuries) Act 1965 ", and the words " Chairman of the Post Office Users' Council ". In Part II of Schedule 1 as substituted by Schedule 3 (Northern Ireland), the words " The Consumer Council ", the words " The Iron and Steel Holding and Realisation Agency ", the words " The Sites Commission constituted under the Industries Development Act (Northern Ireland) 1945 ", the words " The Transport Tribunal for Northern Ireland " and the words " The Ulster Transport Authority ". In Part III of Schedule 1 as substituted by Schedule 3 (Northern Ireland), the words " Chairman of the Post Office Users' Council ". Schedule 4.
6 & 7 Eliz. 2. c. 51	Public Records Act 1958	The Public Records Act 1958.	In Schedule 2, the entry relating to the Cotton (Centralised Buying) Act 1947.
1967 c. 34	Industrial Injuries and Diseases (Old Cases) Act 1967	The Industrial Injuries and Diseases (Old Cases) Act 1967.	In section 13(1)(a), the words " or falling to be construed as a reference to ".
1967 c. 57	Control of Liquid Fuel Act 1967	The Control of Liquid Fuel Act 1967.	The whole act.
1968 c. 13	National Loans Act 1968	The National Loans Act 1968.	Section 21(4).
1971 c. 23	Courts Act 1971	The Courts Act 1971.	In Schedule 2, in paragraph 6, the words " section 13 of ".
Acts of Parliament of Scotland
1503 (c. 9)	Spuilzie Act 1503	The Spuilzie Act 1503.	The whole act.
1540 (c. 22)	Judges Act 1540	The Judges Act 1540.	The whole act.
1563 (c. 17)	Notaries Act 1563	The Notaries Act 1563.	The whole act.
1681 (c. 83)	Judicial Sale Act 1681	The Judicial Sale Act 1681.	The whole act.
1690 (c. 49)	Judicial Sale Act 1690	The Judicial Sale Act 1690.	The whole act.
1695 (c. 8)	Judicial Sale Act 1695	The Judicial Sale Act 1695.	The whole act.
Acts of Parliament of Ireland
3 & 4 Phil. & Mar. c. 14 (I)	Queen Regents' Prerogative Act (Ireland) 1556	The Queen Regents' Prerogative Act (Ireland) 1556.	The whole act.
2 Eliz. 1. c. 1 (I)	Act of Supremacy (Ireland) 1560	The Act of Supremacy (Ireland) 1560.	The preamble. Sections 1, 3, 4, 6, 16 and 17.
7 Will. 3. c. 3 (I)	Settlement of Ireland Act 1695	The Settlement of Ireland Act 1695.	The whole act.

== Subsequent developments ==
Paragraph 3 of schedule 2 to the act was repealed by section 10(2) of, and schedule 3 to, the House of Commons Disqualification Act 1975, which came into force on 8 May 1975.

In section 2(1) of the act, the words from "but nothing" onwards and in paragraph 2(2) of schedule 2 to the act, the words from "but nothing" onwards were repealed by section 1(1) of, and part XIII of schedule 1 to, the Statute Law (Repeals) Act 1977, which came into force on 16 June 1977.

In section 2(1), the words ", except as provided by paragraph 2(2) of Schedule 2 to this Act", in section 2(2), the words from "or the Isle of Man" to the end, schedule 1 to the act, except for parts II, VI and XI and the savings specified at the end of those parts, and paragraph 2 of schedule 2 to the act was repealed by group 1 of part IX of schedule 1 to the Statute Law (Repeals) Act 1998, which came into force on 19 November 1998. The orders in council made under section 2(2) of the act have lapsed because of the repeal made to that section by the 1998 act.

Paragraph 4 of schedule 2 to the act was repealed by section 1(1) of, and group 1 of part 2 of Schedule 1 to, the Statute Law (Repeals) Act 2004, which came into force on 22 July 2004.

== See also ==
- Statute Law (Repeals) Act

== Bibliography ==
- "Statute Law (Repeals) Act 1974", Halsbury's Statutes, vol. 41 (Fourth ed.), p. 780, 2008
- The Public General Acts 1973, vol. II, London: HMSO, 1974, p. 1025
