= List of acts of the Parliament of Great Britain from 1709 =

This is a complete list of acts of the Parliament of Great Britain for the year 1709.

For acts passed until 1707, see the list of acts of the Parliament of England and the list of acts of the Parliament of Scotland. See also the list of acts of the Parliament of Ireland.

For acts passed from 1801 onwards, see the list of acts of the Parliament of the United Kingdom. For acts of the devolved parliaments and assemblies in the United Kingdom, see the list of acts of the Scottish Parliament, the list of acts of the Northern Ireland Assembly, and the list of acts and measures of Senedd Cymru; see also the list of acts of the Parliament of Northern Ireland.

The number shown after each act's title is its chapter number. Acts are cited using this number, preceded by the year(s) of the reign during which the relevant parliamentary session was held; thus the Union with Ireland Act 1800 is cited as "39 & 40 Geo. 3. c. 67", meaning the 67th act passed during the session that started in the 39th year of the reign of George III and which finished in the 40th year of that reign. Note that the modern convention is to use Arabic numerals in citations (thus "41 Geo. 3" rather than "41 Geo. III"). Acts of the last session of the Parliament of Great Britain and the first session of the Parliament of the United Kingdom are both cited as "41 Geo. 3".

Acts passed by the Parliament of Great Britain did not have a short title; however, some of these acts have subsequently been given a short title by acts of the Parliament of the United Kingdom (such as the Short Titles Act 1896).

Before the Acts of Parliament (Commencement) Act 1793 came into force on 8 April 1793, acts passed by the Parliament of Great Britain were deemed to have come into effect on the first day of the session in which they were passed. Because of this, the years given in the list below may in fact be the year before a particular act was passed.

== 8 Ann. ==
The second session of the 2nd Parliament of Great Britain, which met from 15 November 1709 until 5 April 1710.

This session was also traditionally cited as 8 Anne or 8 A.

=== Public acts ===
Short title	Citation	Royal assent
Long title
Bank of England Act 1709 (repealed)	8 Ann. c. 1	10 December 1709
An Act for granting an Aid to Her Majesty, to be raised by a Land Tax in Great Britain, for the Service of the Year One Thousand Seven Hundred and Ten. (Repealed by Statute Law Revision Act 1867 (30 & 31 Vict. c. 59) and Bank of England Act 1946 (9 & 10 Geo. 6. c. 27))
Exportation Act 1709 (repealed)	8 Ann. c. 2	10 December 1709
An Act to prohibit the Exportation of Corn, Malt, Meal, Flour, Bread, Biscuit, and Starch; and Low Wines, Spirits, Worts, and Wash, drawn from Malted Corn. (Repealed by Statute Law Revision Act 1867 (30 & 31 Vict. c. 59))
Taxation Act 1709 (repealed)	8 Ann. c. 3	23 December 1709
An Act for charging and continuing the Duties upon Malt, Mum, Cyder, and Perry, for the Service of the Year One Thousand Seven Hundred and Ten. (Repealed by Statute Law Revision Act 1867 (30 & 31 Vict. c. 59))
Catwater Harbour and Sutton Pool, Plymouth Act 1709	8 Ann. c. 4	13 March 1710
An Act for clearing, preserving, and maintaining, the Harbour of Cat-water, lying near Plimouth, in the County of Devon; and for the cleansing and keeping clean the Pool commonly called Sutton Pool, lying in Plimouth aforesaid.
Stamps Act 1709 (repealed)	8 Ann. c. 5 (Note: This is the chapter in The Statutes of the Realm.); 8 Ann. c. 9 (Note: This is the chapter in The Statutes at Large.)	24 March 1710
An Act for laying certain Duties upon Candles, and certain Rates upon Monies to be given with Clerks and Apprentices, towards raising Her Majesty's Supply, for the Year One Thousand Seven Hundred and Ten. (Repealed by Inland Revenue Repeal Act 1870 (33 & 34 Vict. c. 99))
Mutiny Act 1709 (repealed)	8 Ann. c. 6; 8 Ann. c. 10	24 March 1710
An Act to continue the Act (Note: Mutiny Act 1708 (7 Ann. c. 4)) for punishing Mutiny and Desertion; and for the better Payment of the Army and Quarters. (Repealed by Statute Law Revision Act 1867 (30 & 31 Vict. c. 59))
Exportation (No. 2) Act 1709 (repealed)	8 Ann. c. 7; 8 Ann. c. 11	24 March 1710
An Act to explain so much of the Act (Note: Exportation Act 1709 (8 Ann. c. 2)) for prohibiting the Exportation of Corn, Malt, Meal, Flour, Bread, Biscuit, and Starch, and Low Wines, Spirits, Worts, and Wash, drawn from Malted Corn; by which Act the said Commodities are admitted to be carried from the Isle of Wight from several Markets; and for giving Liberty to export certain Quantities of Oatmeal, for the Uses of the British Hospitals beyond the Seas. (Repealed by Statute Law Revision Act 1867 (30 & 31 Vict. c. 59))
Liverpool Docks Act 1709 (repealed)	8 Ann. c. 8; 8 Ann. c. 12	24 March 1710
An Act for making a convenient Dock, or Bason, at Leverpoole, for the Security of all Ships trading to and from the said Port of Leverpoole. (Repealed by Mersey Dock Acts Consolidation Act 1858 (21 & 22 Vict. c. xcii))
Northampton Highways Act 1709 (repealed)	8 Ann. c. 9; 8 Ann. c. 2 Pr.	27 February 1710
An Act for repairing the Highways between the House commonly called The Horseshoe House, in the Parish of Stoke Goldington, in the County of Bucks, and the Town of Northampton. (Repealed by Newport Pagnel Roads Act 1797 (37 Geo. 3. c. 177))
Taxation (No. 2) Act 1709 (repealed)	8 Ann. c. 10; 8 Ann. c. 4	18 January 1710
An Act for continuing Part of the Duties upon Coals, Culm, and Cinders, and granting new Duties upon Houses having Twenty Windows or more, to raise the Sum of Fifteen Hundred Thousand Pounds, by Way of a Lottery, for the Service of the Year One Thousand Seven Hundred and Ten. (Repealed by Statute Law Revision Act 1867 (30 & 31 Vict. c. 59))
Silk Manufacturers Act 1709 (repealed)	8 Ann. c. 11; 8 Ann. c. 6	27 February 1710
An Act for employing the Manufactures, by encouraging the Consumption of Raw Silk and Mohair Yarn. (Repealed by Repeal of Obsolete Statutes Act 1856 (19 & 20 Vict. c. 64))
Taxation (No. 3) Act 1709 (repealed)	8 Ann. c. 12; 8 Ann. c. 7	13 March 1710
An Act for granting to Her Majesty new Duties of Excise, and upon several imported Commodities; and for establishing a Yearly Fund thereby, and by other Ways and Means, to raise Nine Hundred Thousand Pounds, by Sale of Annuities, and (in Default thereof) by another Lottery, for the Service of the Year One Thousand Seven Hundred and Ten. (Repealed by Statute Law Revision Act 1867 (30 & 31 Vict. c. 59))
Recruiting Act 1709 (repealed)	8 Ann. c. 13; 8 Ann. c. 5	27 February 1710
An Act to continue the Act (Note: Recruiting Act 1708 (7 Ann. c. 2)) for recruiting Her Majesty's Land Forces and Marines, for the Service of the Year One Thousand Seven Hundred and Ten. (Repealed by Statute Law Revision Act 1867 (30 & 31 Vict. c. 59))
Taxation, etc. Act 1709 (repealed)	8 Ann. c. 14; 8 Ann. c. 13	5 April 1710
An Act for continuing several Impositions, additional Impositions, and Duties, upon Goods imported, to raise Money, by Way of Loan, for the Service of the Year One Thousand Seven Hundred and Ten; and for taking off the Over-sea Duty on Coals exported in British Bottoms; and for better preventing Frauds and Drawbacks upon Certificate Goods; and for ascertaining the Duties of Currants imported in Venetian Ships; and to give further Time to Foreign Merchants, for Exportation of certain Foreign Goods imported; and to limit a Time for Prosecutions upon certain Bonds given by Merchants; and for continuing certain Fees of the Officers of the Customs, and to prevent Embezzlements by such Officers; and for appropriating the Monies granted to Her Majesty; and for replacing Monies paid, or to be paid, for making good any Deficiencies on the Annuity Acts; and for Encouragement to raise Naval Stores in Her Majesty's Plantations; and to give further Time for registering Debentures, as is therein mentioned. (Repealed by Statute Law Revision Act 1867 (30 & 31 Vict. c. 59))
Security of the Sovereign Act 1709 (repealed)	8 Ann. c. 15	5 April 1710
An Act for explaining and enlarging an Act of the Sixth Year of Her Majesty's Reign, intituled, "An Act for the Security of Her Majesty's Person and Government." (Note: Succession to the Crown Act 1707 (6 Ann. c. 41)) (Repealed by Promissory Oaths Act 1871 (34 & 35 Vict. c. 48))
Circuit Courts (Scotland) Act 1709 (repealed)	8 Ann. c. 16	5 April 1710
An Act for discharging the Attendance of Noblemen, Barons, and Freeholders, upon the Lords of Justiciary, in their Circuits, in that Part of Great Britain called Scotland; and for abolishing the Method of exhibiting criminal Informations by the Porteous Roll. (Repealed by Criminal Justice (Scotland) Act 1987 (c. 41))
Eddystone Lighthouse Act 1709 (repealed)	8 Ann. c. 17	5 April 1710
An Act for explaining and making more effectual an Act, (Note: Eddystone Lighthouse Act 1705 (4 & 5 Ann. c. 7)) for the better enabling the Master, Wardens, and Assistants of Trinity House, to re-build the Light-house on the Edistone Rock. (Repealed by Statute Law Revision Act 1867 (30 & 31 Vict. c. 59))
Landlord and Tenant Act 1709	8 Ann. c. 18; 8 Ann. c. 14	5 April 1710
An Act for the better Security of Rents and to prevent Frauds committed by Tenants.
Price and Assise of Bread Act 1709 (repealed)	8 Ann. c. 19; 8 Ann. c. 18	5 April 1710
An Act to regulate the Price and Assize of Bread. (Repealed by Making of Bread Act 1757 (31 Geo. 2. c. 29))
Sevenoaks and Tunbridge Highways Act 1709 (repealed)	8 Ann. c. 20; 8 Ann. c. 12 Pr.	24 March 1710
An Act for repairing and amending the Highways leading from Seven Oakes to Woods-gate and Tunbridge Wells, in the County of Kent. (Repealed by Sevenoaks and Tunbridge Wells Roads Act 1814 (54 Geo. 3. c. clxxiv))
Copyright Act 1709 (repealed)	8 Ann. c. 21; 8 Ann. c. 19	5 April 1710
An Act for the Encouragement of Learning, by Vesting the Copies of Printed Books in the Authors or Purchasers of such Copies, during the Times therein mentioned. (Repealed by Copyright Act 1842 (5 & 6 Vict. c. 45))
Militia Act 1709 (repealed)	8 Ann. c. 22; 8 Ann. c. 20	5 April 1710
An Act for raising the Militia for the Year One Thousand Seven Hundred and Ten, although the Month's Pay formerly advanced be not re-paid. (Repealed by Statute Law Revision Act 1867 (30 & 31 Vict. c. 59))
Fortifications Act 1709	8 Ann. c. 23; 8 Ann. c. 21	5 April 1710
An Act for vesting certain Lands, Tenements, and Hereditaments, in Trustees, for the better fortifying and securing the Harbours and Docks at Portsmouth, Chatham, and Harwich.
Poor Law (Hull) Act 1709 (repealed)	8 Ann. c. 24; 8 Ann. c. 11 Pr.	24 March 1710
An Act for the more effectual Provision for the Poor, in the Town of Kingston upon Hull. (Repealed by Hull Poor Relief Act 1824 (5 Geo. 4. c. xiii))
Bedford and Buckingham Highways Act 1709 (repealed)	8 Ann. c. 25; 8 Ann. c. 15 Pr.	5 April 1710
An Act for making more effectual the Act (Note: Bedfordshire and Buckinghamshire Roads Act 1706 (6 Ann. c. 4)) for the repairing the Highway between Fornhill, in the County of Bedford, and Stony Stratford, in the County of Buckingham. (Repealed by Hockliffe and Stony Stratford Road Act 1830 (11 Geo. 4 & 1 Will. 4. c. lxxxiii))

=== Private acts ===
Short title	Citation	Royal assent
Long title
Enabling Peyton Altham an infant trustee to join in suffering a common recovery or levying a fine of an estate in Essex.	8 Ann. c. 1 Pr.	10 December 1709
An Act to enable Peyton Altham, an Infant Trustee, to join in suffering a Common Recovery, or levying a Fine, of an Estate in Essex, as if he were of full Age.
Bettesworth's Estate Act 1709	8 Ann. c. 2 Pr. (Note: This is the chapter in The Statutes of the Realm.); 8 Ann. c. 3 Pr. (Note: This is the chapter in The Statutes at Large.)	27 February 1710
An Act to enable Peter Bettesworth Esquire, and the Trustees in his Marriage Settlement, to sell certain Lands and Hereditaments, in the Counties of Southampton and Sussex, for Payment of his Debts; and to settle another Estate, of greater Yearly Value, for the better Provision for his Family.
Hayward's Estate Act 1709	8 Ann. c. 3 Pr. 8 Ann. c. 4 Pr.	27 February 1710
An Act for making effectual the Provisions intended by William Hayward, late of Quedgley, in the County of Gloucester, Esquire, deceased, for Payment of his Debts, and providing Portions for his Younger Children.
Bridge's Estate Act 1709	8 Ann. c. 4 Pr. 8 Ann. c. 5 Pr.	13 March 1710
An Act for Sale of several Tenements, in Cheek Lane, near West Smithfield (the Estate of James Bridges Esquire); and for purchasing and settling other Estates to the same Uses.
Countess of Oxford's Estate Act 1709	8 Ann. c. 5 Pr. 8 Ann. c. 6 Pr.	13 March 1710
An Act for confirming and establishing a Partition made between Edward Rigby Gentleman, the Honourable Charles Egerton Esquire and the Honourable Elizabeth his Wife, and others, of several Manors and Hereditaments, in the County of Essex, heretofore the Estate of the Right Honourable Anne late Countess of Oxford, deceased; and to enable Margaret, Anne, and Katherine Lennard, Infants, to make Partition of other Lands and Tenements, in the County of Hertford, and in London, other Part of the said Countess of Oxford's Estate.
Rolle's Estate Act 1709	8 Ann. c. 6 Pr. 8 Ann. c. 7 Pr.	13 March 1710
An Act to vest in and enable Trustees to sell some Part of the Estate late of Sir John Rolle Knight of the Bath, deceased, for the Payment of Debts, Legacies, and Portions; and for settling of other Lands to the same Uses.
Knight's Estate Act 1709	8 Ann. c. 7 Pr. 8 Ann. c. 8 Pr.	13 March 1710
An Act for Sale of several Lands and Hereditaments of Isaac Knight Esquire, in the Counties of Nottingham and York, for Payment of the Portion of Hannah the Wife of Thomas Stones Esquire, and the Arrears of an Annuity payable to Dickenson Knight Gentleman; and for settling the Overplus to the same Uses to which the Lands to be sold do stand limited; and for charging other Lands with the said Annuity.
Berrie's Estate Act 1709	8 Ann. c. 8 Pr. 8 Ann. c. 9 Pr.	13 March 1710
An Act for vesting the Estate of Thomas Berrie Esquire, deceased, in Trustees, to be sold, for discharging several Mortgages thereupon, and other his Debts, which his Personal Estate will not extend to pay; and for laying out the Surplus-money for the Benefit of his Widow, and Heir at Law.
Jennens' Estate Act 1709	8 Ann. c. 9 Pr. 8 Ann. c. 10 Pr.	13 March 1710
An Act for vesting the several Manors and Lands therein mentioned, in the County of Oxon, late the Inheritance of William Jennens Esquire, deceased, and by his Marriage Settlement conveyed to the Uses therein expressed, in Trustees, to be sold, for clearing several Incumbrances thereupon, precedent to the said Marriage Settlement; and investing the Surplus of the Money arising by such Sale in a Purchase of other Lands, to the like Uses as were limited by the said Marriage Settlement; and for vesting in the said Trustees such Estate and Interest as the said William Jennens, or the Trustees named in his Marriage Settlement, had, in certain Lands, heretofore called The March Lands, in the Parish of St. Giles in the Fields, in the County of Midd'x, subject to the several precedent Incumbrances thereupon, to be sold, for the Purposes therein mentioned.
Viscount Gormanston's Estate Act 1709	8 Ann. c. 10 Pr. 8 Ann. c. 13 Pr.	24 March 1710
An Act for Sale of Part of the Estate of Anthony Lord Viscount Gormanston, for Payment of his Debts; and for securing a Jointure and a Maintenance for Margaret Viscountess Gormanston, in Lieu of a Rent Charge payable to her out of the said Viscount's Estate.
Summers' Estate Act 1709	8 Ann. c. 11 Pr. 8 Ann. c. 14 Pr.	24 March 1710
An Act to enable Henry Summers Esquire to make Sale of the Manor of Gaynes and other Lands in Huntingdonshire; and, in Lieu thereof, to settle Lands in Essex, of a greater Value, to the same Uses the said Huntingdonshire Estate was settled.
Confirmation of articles of partition between the Earl and Countess of Wemyss and Ann Robinson of their estates in Oxfordshire, Northamptonshire and Kent and for the sale of their respective moieties.	8 Ann. c. 12 Pr. 8 Ann. c. 16 Pr.	5 April 1710
An Act to confirm Articles of Partition made between the Earl and Countess of Wemyss of the one Part, and Anne Robinson Spinster of the other Part, of their Estates in the Counties of Oxon, Northampton, and Kent; and for vesting their respective Moieties in Trustees, to be sold.
Southwell's Estate Act 1709	8 Ann. c. 13 Pr. 8 Ann. c. 17 Pr.	5 April 1710
An Act to make several Trusts in the Marriage Settlements of Edward Southwell Esquire, and the Lady Elizabeth his late Wife, more effectual, to answer the Intent of them; and to explain several Powers therein.
Hamond's Estate Act 1709	8 Ann. c. 14 Pr. 8 Ann. c. 18 Pr.	5 April 1710
An Act to enable Trustees to sell some Fenny Lands, in the Counties of Huntingdon and Cambridge, Part of the Estate of Anthony Hammond Esquire; and to settle other Lands in Lieu thereof.
Tremayne's Estate Act 1709	8 Ann. c. 15 Pr. 8 Ann. c. 19 Pr.	5 April 1710
An Act to enable Trustees to grant, renew, and fill up, Leases of the Estate of Arthur Tremayne Esquire (an Infant), during his Minority.
Ropley Inclosure Act 1709	8 Ann. c. 16 Pr. 8 Ann. c. 20 Pr.	5 April 1710
An Act for the enclosing of Ropley Commons, in the County of Southampton; and for Improvement of the old disparked Park of Farnham, in the Counties of Surrey and Southampton.
Weeks' Jointure Act 1708	8 Ann. c. 17 Pr. 8 Ann. c. 21 Pr.	5 April 1710
An Act to enable the Trustees of the last Will and Testament of Thomas Hobbs Doctor in Physic, deceased, with Abraham Weekes Esquire, to make a Jointure upon the Wife of the said Abraham Weekes.
Pack's Estate Act 1709	8 Ann. c. 18 Pr. 8 Ann. c. 22 Pr.	5 April 1710
An Act to enable certain Trustees to raise Part of the Portions designed for the Younger Children of Clifton Pack Esquire, deceased, and Penelope his Wife, by their Marriage Settlement.
Relief of Joseph Cooper Act 1709	8 Ann. c. 19 Pr. 8 Ann. c. 23 Pr.	5 April 1710
An Act for the Relief of Joseph Cooper Gentleman.
Emerton's Estate Act 1709	8 Ann. c. 20 Pr. 8 Ann. c. 24 Pr.	5 April 1710
An Act for vesting the Freehold and Copyhold Estate, late of William Emerton Esquire, deceased, in the Parish of Chevening, in the County of Kent, in Trustees, to be sold, for the better Support of his Widow, and Advancement of his Two Daughters.
Liverpool Water Supply Act 1709 (repealed)	8 Ann. c. 21 Pr. 8 Ann. c. 25 Pr.	5 April 1710
An Act to enable the Corporation of Leverpoole to make a Grant to Sir Cleve More Baronet, for Liberty to bring fresh Water into the said Town of Leverpoole. (Repealed by Liverpool Corporation Act 1921 (11 & 12 Geo. 5. c. lxxiv))
Scott's Estate Act 1709	8 Ann. c. 22 Pr. 8 Ann. c. 26 Pr.	5 April 1710
An Act for Sale of Part of the Estate of George Scott Esquire, in the County of Kent, for Payment of Debts.
Bigg's Estate Act 1709	8 Ann. c. 23 Pr. 8 Ann. c. 27 Pr.	5 April 1710
An Act to enable Trustees to recover the Personal Estates of William Bigg and Isabel Bigg, now vested in John Bigg, a Lunatic, their Son and Heir, and Executor of his Father, for the Payment of Debts and Legacies.
John Coggs's and John Dann's Estate Act 1709	8 Ann. c. 24 Pr. 8 Ann. c. 28 Pr.	5 April 1710
An Act for vesting the Estate and Effects of John Coggs and John Dann, Goldsmiths and Copartners, in Trustees, for the speedier Payment of their Creditors; and for determining Differences thereupon.

=== Sources ===
- Raithby, John, ed. (1822). "Anno 8° Annæ, A.D. 1709". The Statutes of the Realm. Vol. 9: The Statutes of the Seventh to the Thirteenth Years of the Reign of Queen Anne. pp. 148–264 – via Internet Archive.
- Raithby, John, ed. (1822). "Anno 8° Annæ, A.D. 1709". The Statutes of the Realm. Vol. 9: The Statutes of the Seventh to the Thirteenth Years of the Reign of Queen Anne. pp. 148–264 – via HathiTrust.
- Pickering, Danby, ed. (1764). "Anno octavo Annæ". The Statutes at Large. Vol. 12: From The Eighth to the Twelfth Year of Queen Anne. Cambridge: Joseph Bentham. pp. 1–88 – via Internet Archive.
- Journals of the House of Commons. Vol. 16. London: His Majesty's Stationery Office. 1803. pp. 209–396 – via Google Books.
- Journal of the House of Lords. Vol. 19: 1709-1714. London: His Majesty's Stationery Office. 1830. pp. 3–162 – via British History Online.
- Chronological Table of and Index to the Statutes. Vol. 1: To the End of the Session 59 Vict. Sess. 2 (1895) (13th ed.). London: Her Majesty's Stationery Office. 1896. p. 89 – via Google Books.
- Chronological Table of the Statutes: Covering the Period from 1235 to the End of 1971. London: Her Majesty's Stationery Office. 1972. p. 86. ISBN 978-0-11-840096-1 – via Google Books.
- "Acts of the Parliament of Great Britain from 1709". legislation.gov.uk. The National Archives.

== See also ==
- List of acts of the Parliament of Great Britain
