= West Indian Prisons Act 1838 =

Act of the Parliament of the United Kingdom

West Indian Prisons Act 1838 (Note: The citation of this act by this short title was authorised by section 1 of, and the first schedule to, the Short Titles Act 1896. Due to the repeal of those provisions it is now authorised by section 19(2) of the Interpretation Act 1978.)
- Act of Parliament
- Parliament of the United Kingdom
- Long title: An Act for the better Government of Prisons in the West Indies.
- Citation: 1 & 2 Vict. c. 67
- Territorial extent: United Kingdom

Dates
- Royal assent: 4 August 1838
- Commencement: 4 August 1838 (Note: The Acts of Parliament (Commencement) Act 1793.)
- Repealed: 18 July 1973
Other legislation
| Amended by | Statute Law Revision Act 1874 (No. 2) |
| Repealed by | Statute Law (Repeals) Act 1973 |

Status: Repealed

Text of statute as originally enacted

The West Indian Prisons Act 1838 (1 & 2 Vict. c. 67) was an act of the Parliament of the United Kingdom, signed into law on 4 August 1838.

The act empowered the Queen in Council and the governor and council of any colony to make rules for the government of the prisons of each colony in the West Indies. These were to be binding on all persons, but had to be laid before Parliament. It also empowered the Queen to appoint inspectors of prisons, or to authorise their appointment by the governor of the colony; obstruction of these inspectors in their duties would be subject to a penalty of £20. The governor was to be sent regular returns and plans of prisons, and no person was to be kept in a prison which he certified unfit. He had the power to suspend or dismiss officers of prisons.

The act was to be proclaimed in the Colonies.

== Subsequent developments ==
The whole act was repealed by section 1(1) of, and part VII of schedule 1 to, the Statute Law (Repeals) Act 1973, which came into force on 18 July 1973.

== Bibliography ==
- The British almanac of the Society for the Diffusion of Useful Knowledge, for the year 1839. The Society for the Diffusion of Useful Knowledge, London, 1839.
