= Bank Notes (Ireland) Act 1864 =

Act of the Parliament of the United Kingdom

Bank Notes (Ireland) Act 1864 (Note: The citation of this act by this short title was authorised by section 1 of, and the first schedule to, the Short Titles Act 1896. Due to the repeal of those provisions it is now authorised by section 19(2) of the Interpretation Act 1978.)
- Act of Parliament
- Parliament of the United Kingdom
- Long title: An Act for impressing by Machinery Signatures of Names on Bank Notes and certain Bills of the Bank of Ireland.
- Citation: 27 & 28 Vict. c. 78
- Territorial extent: United Kingdom

Dates
- Royal assent: 29 July 1864
- Commencement: 29 July 1864 (Note: The Acts of Parliament (Commencement) Act 1793.)

Other legislation
- Amended by: Statute Law Revision Act 1893; Statute Law (Repeals) Act 1973

Status: Amended

Text of statute as originally enacted

Revised text of statute as amended

Text of the Bank Notes (Ireland) Act 1864 as in force today (including any amendments) within the United Kingdom, from legislation.gov.uk.

The Bank Notes (Ireland) Act 1864 (27 & 28 Vict. c. 78) is an act of the Parliament of the United Kingdom which allowed bank notes to be impressed using machinery and to be taken as "taken to be good and valid to all intents and purposes".

== Subsequent developments ==
In the preamble, the words " bank post bills " in both places, and in section 1, the words " bank post bills ", wherever occurring, were repealed by section 1(1) of, and part IV of schedule 1 to, the Statute Law (Repeals) Act 1973, which came into force on 18 July 1973.
