= Ecclesiastical Commissioners Act 1847 =

Act of the Parliament of the United Kingdom

Ecclesiastical Commissioners Act 1847 (Note: The citation of this act by this short title was authorised by section 1 of, and the first schedule to, the Short Titles Act 1896. Due to the repeal of those provisions it is now authorised by section 19(2) of the Interpretation Act 1978.)
- Act of Parliament
- Parliament of the United Kingdom
- Long title: An Act for establishing the Bishoprick of Manchester, and amending certain Acts relating to the Ecclesiastical Commissioners for England.
- Citation: 10 & 11 Vict. c. 108
- Territorial extent: United Kingdom

Dates
- Royal assent: 23 July 1847
- Commencement: 23 July 1847 (Note: The Acts of Parliament (Commencement) Act 1793.)
- Repealed: 18 July 1973
Other legislation
Amended by	Statute Law Revision Act 1875
Repealed by	Statute Law (Repeals) Act 1973

Status: Repealed

Text of statute as originally enacted

The Ecclesiastical Commissioners Act 1847 (10 & 11 Vict. c. 108), sometimes called the Bishopric of Manchester Act 1847, was an act of the Parliament of the United Kingdom with the principal purpose of delegating to the Ecclesiastical Commissioners for England the power to put forward a scheme (a form of secondary legislation) to create the Diocese of Manchester. The Ecclesiastical Commissioners scheme containing the precise arrangements for the diocesan changes was put forward to Queen Victoria at Osborne House in the Isle of Wight, on 10 August 1847, where it was assented to in Chambers.

Whilst the act was primarily a procedural enabling device to provide the legal framework for a relatively minor reorganisation within the Church of England, and would normally have ceased to be relevant once the scheme for the creation of the dioceses had been assented to, it incorporated provisions which set the number of Lords Spiritual in the House of Lords at 26, irrespective of the number of bishoprics in England, and created the mechanism for the determining the membership of the Lords Spiritual.

The bill was the subject of debate in the House of Lords at the time, regarding whether "The limitation of the number of Lords Spiritual which it was proposed to establish by this Bill, was not only an infringement of the prerogatives of the Crown, but he also considered that it was a dangerous invasion of the rights and privileges of all the Members of their Lordships' House, temporal and spiritual" as it was government legislation which sought to control the membership of the House of Lords through limiting the ability of the exercise of royal prerogative in the right of issuing writs of summons to call a bishop to the House of Lords that "with respect to the Peerage of this country, this was the first time it had ever been proposed to interfere with the right conferred by it".

== Preamble ==
The preamble, to "Church of Wales and" was repealed by section 1 of, and the Schedule to, the Statute Law Revision Act 1891. The words "for England" were repealed by section 1 of, and the First Schedule to, the Statute Law Revision Act 1894.

== Section 1 ==
This section from "so much" to "and that", was repealed by section 1 of, and the Schedule to, the Statute Law Revision Act 1875. The words "for England" were repealed by section 1 of, and the First Schedule to, the Statute Law Revision Act 1894.

== Section 2 ==
This section, to "enacted that" and from "and whenever" to the end of the section, was repealed by section 1 of, and the Schedule to, the Statute Law Revision Act 1891.

== Section 3 ==
This section was repealed by section 1 of, and the Schedule to, the Statute Law Revision Act 1875.

== Subsequent developments ==
The whole act was repealed by section 1(1) of, and part II of schedule 1 to, the Statute Law (Repeals) Act 1973, which came into force on 18 July 1973.
