= Finance Act 1911 =

Act of the Parliament of the United Kingdom

Finance Act 1911 (Note: Section 22(3).)
- Act of Parliament
- Parliament of the United Kingdom
- Long title: An Act to grant certain duties of Customs and Inland Revenue, to alter other duties, and to amend the Law relating to Customs and Inland Revenue (including Excise) and the National Debt, and to make other provisions for the financial arrangements of the year.
- Citation: 1 & 2 Geo. 5. c. 48
- Territorial extent: United Kingdom

Dates
- Royal assent: 16 December 1911
- Commencement: 16 December 1911 (Note: The Acts of Parliament (Commencement) Act 1793.)
- Repealed: 21 July 2008
Other legislation
Amends	Excise Licences Act 1825; Customs and Inland Revenue Act 1879; Finance Act 1900; Development and Road Improvement Funds Act 1909; Finance (1909-10) Act 1910
Amended by	Statute Law Revision Act 1953; Statute Law Revision Act 1959; Statute Law (Repeals) Act 1973
Repealed by	Statute Law (Repeals) Act 2008

Status: Repealed

Text of statute as originally enacted

The Finance Act 1911 (1 & 2 Geo. 5. c. 48) was an act of the Parliament of the United Kingdom.

== Background ==
The act was enacted following the constitutional crisis caused by the House of Lords’ rejection of the Liberal government’s 1909 Budget, commonly known as the People's Budget. The Budget, introduced by Chancellor of the Exchequer David Lloyd George, proposed higher income taxation and new duties to finance expanding social expenditure, and its rejection marked a significant departure from constitutional convention.

The resulting political crisis led to two general elections in 1910, January and December, and culminated in the passage of the Parliament Act 1911, which restricted the House of Lords’ power to block legislation and removed their ability to veto money bills.

The act formed part of this wider settlement by giving statutory effect to fiscal measures that had previously been delayed or contested, and by consolidating changes to income taxation within the evolving framework of early twentieth-century British public finance.

== Provisions ==
The act increased the standard (basic) rate of income tax from nine pence in the pound (9d) to one shilling and two pence in the pound (1s 2d), while leaving the additional rate (supertax) on higher incomes unchanged. Under the pre-decimal currency system, one pound sterling was divided into 240 pence, meaning that a rate of 9d represented 3.75 per cent of income, while 1s 2d (14d) represented approximately 5.83 per cent. This standard rate of income tax would remained unchanged until 1916, when it was increased in response to the fiscal demands of the First World War.

=== Income tax structure ===
Although the standard rate of income tax in 1911 was one shilling and two pence in the pound (1s 2d), income tax was not payable on the first £160 of income. Above this level, liability was reduced through a system of abatements, with the full standard rate applying only once abatements were exhausted. As a result, income tax applied to a relatively small proportion of the population, and only a minority of taxpayers paid the full basic rate.

An additional duty (supertax) applied only to individuals with total incomes exceeding £5,000 per year, charged at six pence in the pound on the relevant portion of income. The Finance Act 1911 did not alter the supertax threshold or rate, which remained governed by the provisions introduced in 1909–10.

Income band (1911)	Marginal rate	Notes
Up to £160	0%	Exempt from income tax
Above £160 (subject to abatements)	1s 2d in the £ (14d ≈ 5.83%)	Reduced liability until abatements exhausted
Total income above £5,000	Additional duty (supertax) at 6d in the £ (≈2.5%)	Applied only above the supertax threshold

Gross income	Exempt amount	Taxable after abatement	Basic tax payable	Cumulative tax payable	Notes
£150	£150	£0	£0	£0	Below income tax threshold
£200	£160	£40	£2 6s 8d	£2 6s 8d	Abatement reduces liability
£400	£160	£240	£14	£14	Effective rate below statutory rate
£700	£160	£540	£31 10s	£31 10s	Full basic rate applies
£1,000	£160	£840	£49	£49	No supertax liability
£5,000	£160	£4,840	£282 6s 8d	£282 6s 8d	Supertax threshold reached
£10,000	£160	£9,840	£573	£698	Supertax applies above £5,000

Note: The examples above illustrate the effect of statutory exemptions and abatements under the income tax regime in force in 1911. Actual liability depended on income composition and reliefs, and the figures are illustrative rather than exhaustive.

== Subsequent developments ==
Section 16, so far as unrepealed, was repealed for Northern Ireland by section 1 of, and the first schedule to, the Statute Law Revision Act 1953 (2 & 3 Eliz. 2. c. 5), which came into force on 18 December 1953.

Sections 21 and 22(2) of the act were repealed by section 1(1) of, and part XIII of schedule 1 to, the Statute Law (Repeals) Act 1973, which came into force on 18 July 1973.

The whole act was repealed by section 1(1) of, and part 8 of schedule 1 to, the Statute Law (Repeals) Act 2008, which came into force on 21 July 2008.
