= Bank of England Act 1716 =

Act of the Parliament of Great Britain

Bank of England Act 1716 (Note: The citation of this act by this short title was authorised by section 1 of, and the first schedule to, the Short Titles Act 1896. Due to the repeal of those provisions, it is now authorised by section 19(2) of the Interpretation Act 1978.)
- Act of Parliament
- Parliament of Great Britain
- Long title: An Act for redeeming several Funds of the Governor and Company of the Bank of England, pursuant to former Provisoes of Redemption; and for securing to them several new funds and allowances redeemable by parliament; and for obliging them to advance further sums not exceeding two millions five hundred thousand pounds, at five pounds per centum, as shall be found necessary to be employed in lessening the national debts and incumbrances; and for continuing certain provisions formerly made for the expences of his Majesty's civil government; and for payment of annuities formerly purchased at the rate of five pounds per centum; and for other Purposes in this Act mentioned.
- Citation: 3 Geo. 1. c. 8
- Territorial extent: Great Britain

Dates
- Royal assent: 15 July 1717
- Commencement: 20 February 1717 (Note: Start of session.)
- Repealed: 8 November 1995
Other legislation
Amended by	Statute Law Revision Act 1870; Statute Law Revision Act 1887; Statute Law Revision Act 1888; Bank Act 1892; Bank of England Act 1946; Statute Law Revision Act 1948
Repealed by	Statute Law (Repeals) Act 1995

Status: Repealed

Text of statute as originally enacted

Revised text of statute as amended

The Bank of England Act 1716 (3 Geo. 1. c. 8) was an act of the Parliament of Great Britain. It was one of the Bank of England Acts 1694 to 1892.

== Subsequent developments ==
Sections 1–37, 40–44, 46–52 and 54–56 of the act were repealed by section 1 of, and the schedule to, the Statute Law Revision Act 1870 (33 & 34 Vict. c. 69), which came into force on 9 August 1870.

The act was partially repealed by Statute Law Revision Act 1887 (50 & 51 Vict. c. 59), the Statute Law Revision Act 1888 (51 & 52 Vict. c. 3), the Bank Act 1892 ( 55 & 56 Vict. c. 48), the Bank of England Act 1946 (9 & 10 Geo. 6. c. 27), and the Statute Law Revision Act 1948 (11 & 12 Geo. 6. c. 62).

The whole act was repealed by section 1(1) of, and group 2 of part VI of schedule 1 to, the Statute Law (Repeals) Act 1995, which came into force on 8 November 1995.
