= List of acts of the Parliament of Scotland from 1424 =

This is a list of acts of the Parliament of Scotland for the year 1424.

It lists acts of Parliament of the old Parliament of Scotland, that was merged with the old Parliament of England to form the Parliament of Great Britain, by the Union with England Act 1707 (c. 7).

For other years, see list of acts of the Parliament of Scotland. For the period after 1707, see list of acts of the Parliament of Great Britain.

== 1424 ==
=== May ===
The 1st parliament of James I, held at Perth on 26 May 1425.

Short title, or popular name	Citation	Royal assent
Long title
Church Act 1424 (repealed)	May 1424 c. 1 (Note: This is the citation in the Record Edition.); 1424 c. 1 (Note: This is the citation in the Duodecimal Edition.)	26 May 1424
Of the fredome of halikirk. Of the freedom of the holy church. (Repealed by Statute Law Revision (Scotland) Act 1906 (6 Edw. 7. c. 38)) (Note: This act was repealed because it had been superseded by 1425 c. 1.)
Public Peace Act 1424 (repealed)	May 1424 c. 2; 1424 c. 2	26 May 1424
Of pece to be kepit throu the realme. Of peace to be kept though the realm. (Repealed by Statute Law Revision (Scotland) Act 1906 (6 Edw. 7. c. 38))
Treason Act 1424 (repealed)	May 1424 c. 3; 1424 c. 3	26 May 1424
Of rebellouris aganis the kingis persone. Of rebellion against the king's person. (Repealed by Statute Law Revision (Scotland) Act 1906 (6 Edw. 7. c. 38))
Treason (No. 2) Act 1424 (repealed)	May 1424 c. 4; 1424 c. 4	26 May 1424
Of inforsing the King aganis notour rebellouris. Of enforcing the King against notorious rebels. (Repealed by Statute Law Revision (Scotland) Act 1906 (6 Edw. 7. c. 38))
Riders and Gangers Act 1424 (repealed)	May 1424 c. 5; 1424 c. 5	26 May 1424
Of ridaris and gangaris throu the cuntre. Of riding and going through the country. (Repealed by Statute Law Revision (Scotland) Act 1906 (6 Edw. 7. c. 38))
Officers of Law Act 1424 (repealed)	May 1424 c. 6; 1424 c. 6	26 May 1424
Of the ministeris and officiaris of law throu the realme. Of ministers and officers of law through the realm. (Repealed by Statute Law Revision (Scotland) Act 1906 (6 Edw. 7. c. 38))
Sorners Act 1424 (repealed)	May 1424 c. 7; 1424 c. 7	26 May 1424
Of sornaris. Of sorners. (Repealed by Statute Law Revision (Scotland) Act 1906 (6 Edw. 7. c. 38))
Customs and Burgh Mails Act 1424 (repealed)	May 1424 c. 8; 1424 c. 8	26 May 1424
Of the custumis and buroumaillis of the realme. Of the customs and burgh-mails of the realm. (Repealed by Statute Law Revision (Scotland) Act 1906 (6 Edw. 7. c. 38))
Crown Revenues Act 1424 (repealed)	May 1424 c. 9; 1424 c. 9	26 May 1424
Anent inquisicione of the kingis landis possessionis and annuel rentis. About inquests of the King's lands, possessions and annual rents. (Repealed by Statute Law Revision (Scotland) Act 1906 (6 Edw. 7. c. 38))
Supply Act 1424 (repealed)	May 1424 c. 10 — (Note: This act is not listed in the Duodecimal Edition.)	26 May 1424
Of a general yelde to be rasyt for the payment of the finance to be made in Ingland for our lord the kingis costage. Of a general yield to be raised for the payment of the finance to be made in England for our lord the King's ransom. (Repealed by Statute Law Revision (Scotland) Act 1906 (6 Edw. 7. c. 38))
Salmon Act 1424 (repealed)	May 1424 c. 11; 1424 c. 10	26 May 1424
Of slauchter of salmonde in tyme forbodyne be the law. Of slaughter of salmon in time forbidden by the law. (Repealed by Statute Law Revision (Scotland) Act 1906 (6 Edw. 7. c. 38))
Salmon (No. 2) Act 1424 (repealed)	May 1424 c. 12; 1424 c. 11	26 May 1424
Of crufis and yaris. (Note: This act related to "cruives and yairs, i.e. salmon traps and salmon yards or dams".); Of cruives and yairs. (Repealed by the Statute Law Revision (Scotland) Act 1964 (c. 80))
Royal Mines Act 1424 still in force	May 1424 c. 13; 1424 c. 12	26 May 1424
Of mynis of golde and silver. Of mines of gold and silver.
Clergy Act 1424 (repealed)	May 1424 c. 14; 1424 c. 13	26 May 1424
Of clarkis and thair procuratoris passand oure the see. Of clerics and their procurators who travel overseas. (Repealed by Statute Law Revision (Scotland) Act 1906 (6 Edw. 7. c. 38))
Clergy (No. 2) Act 1424 (repealed)	May 1424 c. 15; 1424 c. 14	26 May 1424
Of clerkis purchessand pensionis out of beneficis. Of clerics purchasing pensions out of benefices. (Repealed by Statute Law Revision (Scotland) Act 1906 (6 Edw. 7. c. 38))
Export Duty Act 1424 (repealed)	May 1424 c. 16; 1424 c. 15	26 May 1424
Of the custum of gold and silver had oute of the realme. Of the custom of gold and silver taken out of the realm. (Repealed by Statute Law Revision (Scotland) Act 1906 (6 Edw. 7. c. 38))
Export Duty (No. 2) Act 1424 (repealed)	May 1424 c. 17; 1424 c. 16	26 May 1424
Of strangeris that sellis merchandise in the realme and takis mone tharfor. Of foreigners who sell merchandise in the realm and take money for it. (Repealed by Statute Law Revision (Scotland) Act 1906 (6 Edw. 7. c. 38))
Football Act 1424 (repealed)	May 1424 c. 18; 1424 c. 17	26 May 1424
Of playing at the fut ball. Of playing at the football. (Repealed by Statute Law Revision (Scotland) Act 1906 (6 Edw. 7. c. 38))
Archers Act 1424 (repealed)	May 1424 c. 19; 1424 c. 18	26 May 1424
Of archaris. Of archers. (Repealed by Statute Law Revision (Scotland) Act 1906 (6 Edw. 7. c. 38))
Rooks Act 1424 (repealed)	May 1424 c. 20; 1424 c. 19	26 May 1424
Of rukis biggande in treis. Of rooks building in trees. (Repealed by Statute Law Revision (Scotland) Act 1906 (6 Edw. 7. c. 38))
Muirburn Act 1424 (repealed)	May 1424 c. 21; 1424 c. 20	26 May 1424
Of murbyrne. Of burning of moors. (Repealed by Statute Law Revision (Scotland) Act 1906 (6 Edw. 7. c. 38))
Customs Act 1424 (repealed)	May 1424 c. 22; 1424 c. 21	26 May 1424
Of the custum of hors nolt scheip and hering. Of the custom of horse, cattle, sheep and herring. (Repealed by Statute Law Revision (Scotland) Act 1906 (6 Edw. 7. c. 38))
Customs (No. 2) Act 1424 (repealed)	May 1424 c. 23; 1424 c. 22	26 May 1424
Of the custum of mertrik skynnis and other furringis. Of the custom of marten skins and other furs. (Repealed by Statute Law Revision (Scotland) Act 1906 (6 Edw. 7. c. 38))
Coinage Act 1424 (repealed)	May 1424 c. 24; 1424 c. 23	26 May 1424
Of the amending of the mone. Of amending the money. (Repealed by Statute Law Revision (Scotland) Act 1906 (6 Edw. 7. c. 38))
Innkeepers Act 1424 (repealed)	May 1424 c. 25; 1424 c. 24	26 May 1424
Of hostilaris in burowis townis and thruchfaris. Of hostellers in burghs and thoroughfares. (Repealed by Statute Law (Repeals) Act 1989 (c. 43))
Beggars Act 1424 (Note: This act is a spurious entry in some editions of the printed acts, made from an amalgamation of three acts passed in 1425, 1428 and 1429.) (repealed)	May 1424 c. 25; 1424 c. 25	26 May 1424
Of the age and mark of beggars, and of idle men. (Repealed by Statute Law Revision (Scotland) Act 1906 (6 Edw. 7. c. 38))
Not public and general	May 1424 c. 26 —	26 May 1424
Anent the complaynt of Maister Nicholl of Cumnok apone Maister Ingrem Lindissay that he purchest in the court of Rome ane pensione out of the denry of Abirdene. About the complaint of Mr Nicholas of Cumnock upon Mr Ingeram Lindsay, that he purchased in the court of Rome a pension out of the deanery of Aberdeen.
Supply (No. 2) Act 1424 (repealed)	May 1424 c. 27 —	26 May 1424
Of the chevisance to be maide in Flanderis for payment of the finance for the kingis costage. Of the chevisance to be made in Flanders for payment of the finance for the King's ransom. (Repealed by Statute Law Revision (Scotland) Act 1906 (6 Edw. 7. c. 38))

=== March ===
The 2nd parliament of James I, held at Perth on 12 March 1425.

Short title, or popular name	Citation	Royal assent
Long title
Church (No. 2) Act 1424 (repealed)	March 1424 c. 1 (Note: This is the citation in the Record Edition.); 1424 c. 26 (Note: This is the citation in the Duodecimal Edition.)	12 March 1425
Of the fredome of the halykirk. Of the freedom of the holy church. (Repealed by Statute Law Revision (Scotland) Act 1906 (6 Edw. 7. c. 38))
Hospitals Act 1424 (repealed)	March 1424 c. 2; 1424 c. 27	12 March 1425
Anent hospitalis. About hospitals. (Repealed by Statute Law Revision (Scotland) Act 1906 (6 Edw. 7. c. 38))
Lollard Act 1424 (repealed)	March 1424 c. 3; 1424 c. 28	12 March 1425
Anontis heretikis and lollardis. About heretics and lollards. (Repealed by Statute Law Revision (Scotland) Act 1906 (6 Edw. 7. c. 38))
Observance of Statutes Act 1425 or the Observance of Statutes Act 1425 (repealed)	March 1424 c. 43; 1424 c. 29	12 March 1425
Anent the keping of the statutis maid in the kingis first parliament. About the keeping of the statutes made in the king's first parliament. (Repealed by Statute Law Revision (Scotland) Act 1906 (6 Edw. 7. c. 38))
Leagues Act 1425 or the Leagues Act 1424 (repealed)	March 1424 c. 53; 1424 c. 30	12 March 1425
Anent ligis and bandis. Of leagues and bonds. (Repealed by Statute Law Revision (Scotland) Act 1906 (6 Edw. 7. c. 38))
Trade in Flanders Act 1424 (repealed)	March 1424 c. 6 — (Note: This act is not listed in the Duodecimal Edition.)	12 March 1425
Of merchandis passand in Flanderis. Of merchants travelling in Flanders. (Repealed by Statute Law Revision (Scotland) Act 1906 (6 Edw. 7. c. 38))
Horses Act 1425 or the Horses Act 1424 (repealed)	March 1424 c. 73; 1424 c. 31	12 March 1425
Of the selling of hors. Of the selling of horses. (Repealed by Statute Law Revision (Scotland) Act 1906 (6 Edw. 7. c. 38))
Tallow Act 1425 or the Tallow Act 1424 (repealed)	March 1424 c. 8; 1424 c. 32	12 March 1425
Anent talch. About tallow. (Repealed by Statute Law Revision (Scotland) Act 1906 (6 Edw. 7. c. 38))
Price of Food Act 1424 (repealed)	March 1424 c. 9 —	12 March 1425
Of the pricis of vittallis. Of the price of victuals. (Repealed by Statute Law Revision (Scotland) Act 1906 (6 Edw. 7. c. 38))
Theft of Green Wood Act 1424 or the Theft of Green Wood Act 1425 (repealed)	March 1424 c. 10 c. 33	12 March 1425
Of the steyllaris of greene wode and brekaris of orchardis. (Note: The title is sometimes rendered "Of the steyllaris of grene wode and brekaris of orchardis".); Of the stealing of green wood and breaking of orchards. (Repealed by Statute Law Revision (Scotland) Act 1906 (6 Edw. 7. c. 38))
Stolen Wood Act 1424 or the Stolen Wood Act 1425 (repealed)	March 1424 c. 11 c. 34	12 March 1425
Of stollyn wode fundyn in uthir lordis landis. Of stolen wood found in any other lord's land. (Repealed by Statute Law Revision (Scotland) Act 1906 (6 Edw. 7. c. 38))
Salmon Act 1424 (repealed)	March 1424 c. 12 —	12 March 1425
Anentis salmonde. About salmon. (Repealed by Salmon Fisheries (Scotland) Act 1828 (9 Geo. 4. c. 39))
Deer Act 1424 or the Deer Act 1425 (repealed)	March 1424 c. 13; 1424 c. 36	12 March 1425
Anent stalkiris that slais deir. (Note: The title is sometimes rendered "Anent stalkaris that slais deir"); About stalkers that slay deer. (Repealed by Statute Law Revision (Scotland) Act 1906 (6 Edw. 7. c. 38))
Reset Act 1424 or the Reset Act 1425 (repealed)	March 1424 c. 14 —	12 March 1425
Of resettouris of theffis and reffaris. Of thieves and reivers (Repealed by Statute Law Revision (Scotland) Act 1906 (6 Edw. 7. c. 38))
Treason Act 1425 or the Treason Act 1424 (repealed)	March 1424 c. 15; 1424 c. 37	12 March 1425
Of resettouris of rebellouris. Of harbourers of rebels. (Repealed by Statute Law Revision (Scotland) Act 1906 (6 Edw. 7. c. 38))
Foreign Trade Act 1424 (repealed)	March 1424 c. 16; 1424 c. 38	12 March 1425
Of merchandis passand our the see. Of merchants passing overseas. (Repealed by Statute Law Revision (Scotland) Act 1906 (6 Edw. 7. c. 38))
Deacons of Crafts Act 1424 or the Deacons of Crafts Act 1425 (repealed)	March 1424 c. 17 —	12 March 1425
Of dekynis of craftis. Of deacons of crafts. (Repealed by Deacons of Crafts Act 1427 (c. 4))
Prayers for Royal Family Act 1424 (repealed)	March 1424 c. 18 —	12 March 1425
Anent the ordinance of processionis and prayeris for the king the quen and thar barntyme. About the ordinance of processions and prayers for the king, the queen, and their children. (Repealed by Statute Law Revision (Scotland) Act 1906 (6 Edw. 7. c. 38))
Customs (No. 3) Act 1424 (repealed)	March 1424 c. 19; 1424 c. 40	12 March 1425
Of the custum of wollyn clayth. Of the custom of woollen cloth. (Repealed by Statute Law Revision (Scotland) Act 1906 (6 Edw. 7. c. 38))
Labourers Act 1424 or the Labourers Act 1425 (repealed)	March 1424 c. 20; 1424 c. 41	12 March 1425
Anent the laboraris of the erd. About the labourers of the earth. (Repealed by Statute Law Revision (Scotland) Act 1906 (6 Edw. 7. c. 38))
Beggars (No. 2) Act 1424 (repealed)	March 1424 c. 21; 1424 c. 42	12 March 1425
Of thiggaris. Of beggars. (Repealed by Statute Law Revision (Scotland) Act 1906 (6 Edw. 7. c. 38))
Leasing Making Act 1424 or the Leasing Making Act 1425 (repealed)	March 1424 c. 22; 1424 c. 43	12 March 1425
Anent lesing makaris. About telling of lies. (Repealed by Statute Law Revision (Scotland) Act 1906 (6 Edw. 7. c. 38))
Wapinschaws Act 1424 (repealed)	March 1424 c. 23; 1424 c. 44	12 March 1425
Of wapynschawingis. Of wapinshaws. (Repealed by Statute Law Revision (Scotland) Act 1906 (6 Edw. 7. c. 38))
Poor's Counsel Act 1424 or the Poor's Counsel Act 1425 (repealed)	March 1424 c. 24; 1424 c. 45	12 March 1425
Anent billis of complayntis. About bills of complaint. (Repealed by Statute Law (Repeals) Act 1973 (c. 39))
Remissions Act 1424 (repealed)	March 1424 c. 25; 1424 c. 46	12 March 1425
Anent remissionis to be gevyn. About remissions to be given. (Repealed by Statute Law Revision (Scotland) Act 1906 (6 Edw. 7. c. 38))

=== Sources ===
- Alexander, William (1841). "Acta Parliamentorum Regis Jacobi Primi". An Abridgement of the Acts of the Parliaments of Scotland. Edinburgh: Adam and Charles Black. p. 438 – via Google Books.
- Alexander, William (1841). "Acta Parliamentorum Regis Jacobi Primi". An Abridgement of the Acts of the Parliaments of Scotland. Edinburgh: Adam and Charles Black. p. 438 – via Google Books.
- Chronological Table of the Statutes. London: Her Majesty's Stationery Office. 1972. pp. 1314–1315 – via Google Books.
- "Acts of the Old Scottish Parliament: 1424". legislation.gov.uk. The National Archives.
- "Index of Statutes: James I (1406-1437)". Records of the Parliaments of Scotland to 1707. University of St Andrews.

== See also ==
- List of legislation in the United Kingdom
- Records of the Parliaments of Scotland
