= Isle of Man (War Legislation) Act 1939 =

Act of the Parliament of the United Kingdom

Isle of Man (War Legislation) Act 1939 (Note: Section 2(1).)
- Act of Parliament
- Parliament of the United Kingdom
- Long title: An Act to enable His Majesty by Order in Council to extend to the Isle of Man acts passed for purposes connected with the defence of the Realm.
- Citation: 2 & 3 Geo. 6. c. 86
- Territorial extent: United Kingdom

Dates
- Royal assent: 3 September 1939
- Commencement: 3 September 1939 (Note: The Acts of Parliament (Commencement) Act 1793.)
- Expired: By order in council (Note: Section 2(2).)
- Repealed: 18 July 1973
Other legislation
Repealed by	Statute Law (Repeals) Act 1973

Status: Repealed

Text of statute as originally enacted

Isle of Man (War Legislation) Act 1914 (Note: Section 2.)
- Act of Parliament
- Parliament of the United Kingdom
- Long title: An Act to enable His Majesty, by Order in Council, to extend to the Isle of Man Acts passed in connection with the present War.
- Citation: 4 & 5 Geo. 5. c. 62
- Territorial extent: United Kingdom

Dates
- Royal assent: 28 August 1914
- Commencement: 28 August 1914
- Repealed: 22 December 1927
Other legislation
Repealed by	Statute Law Revision Act 1927

Status: Repealed

Text of statute as originally enacted

The Isle of Man (War Legislation) Act 1939 (2 & 3 Geo. 6. c. 86) was an act of the Parliament of the United Kingdom that permitted any part of UK legislation related to defence to be extended to the Isle of Man directly by Order in Council, bypassing Tynwald.

A similar act, the Isle of Man (War Legislation) Act 1914 (4 & 5 Geo. 5. c. 62), had been in force for the duration of the First World War.

== Subsequent developments ==
The whole act was repealed by section 1(1) of, and part VII of schedule 1 to, the Statute Law (Repeals) Act 1973, which came into force on 18 July 1973.
