= Circuit Courts (Scotland) Act 1709 =

Act of the Parliament of Great Britain

Circuit Courts (Scotland) Act 1709 (Note: The citation of this act by this short title was authorised by section 1 of, and the first schedule to, the Short Titles Act 1896. Due to the repeal of those provisions it is now authorised by section 19(2) of the Interpretation Act 1978.)
- Act of Parliament
- Parliament of Great Britain
- Long title: An Act for discharging the Attendance of Noblemen, Barons, and Freeholders upon the Lords of Justiciary in their Circuits in that Part of Great Britain called Scotland, and for abolishing the Method of exhibiting criminal Informations by the Porteous Roll. (Note: These words are printed against this act in the second column of the first schedule to the Short Titles Act 1896, which is headed "Title".)
- Citation: 8 Ann. c. 16
- Territorial extent: Scotland (Note: Preamble.)

Dates
- Royal assent: 5 April 1710
- Commencement: 1 May 1710 (Note: Section 1.)
- Repealed: 1 September 1987 (Note: The Criminal Justice (Scotland) Act 1987 (Commencement No.1) Order 1987.)

Other legislation
- Amended by: Statute Law Revision Act 1867; Statute Law Revision Act 1948
- Repealed by: Criminal Justice (Scotland) Act 1987

Status: Repealed

Text of statute as originally enacted

The Circuit Courts (Scotland) Act 1709 (8 Ann. c. 16) was an act of the Parliament of Great Britain.

== Subsequent developments ==
Section 3 of the act was repealed by section 1 of, and the schedule to, the Statute Law Revision Act 1867 (30 & 31 Vict. c. 59), which came into force on 15 July 1867.

The words of commencement in section 4, section 2, section 4 and section 6 of the act were repealed by section 1 of, and the first schedule to, the Statute Law Revision Act 1948 (11 & 12 Geo. 6. c. 62), which came into force on 30 July 1948.

The whole act was repealed by section 70(2) of, and schedule 2 to, the Criminal Justice (Scotland) Act 1987.
