= Landlord and Tenant Act 1709 =

Act of the Parliament of Great Britain

Landlord and Tenant Act 1709 (Note: The citation of this act by this short title was authorised by section 1 of, and the first schedule to, the Short Titles Act 1896. Due to the repeal of those provisions it is now authorised by section 19(2) of the Interpretation Act 1978.)
- Act of Parliament
- Parliament of Great Britain
- Long title: An Act for the better Security of Rents and to prevent Frauds committed by Tenants.
- Citation: 8 Ann. c. 18 (Note: This is the citation in The Statutes of the Realm); 8 Ann. c. 14 (Note: This is the citation in The Statutes at Large)
- Territorial extent: England and Wales; Scotland

Dates
- Royal assent: 5 April 1710
- Commencement: 1 May 1710 (Note: Section 1.)

Other legislation
- Amended by: Statute Law Revision Act 1867; Statute Law Revision Act 1948; County Courts Act 1959; County Courts Act 1984; Insolvency Act 1985; Insolvency Act 1986; Tribunals, Courts and Enforcement Act 2007

Status: Partially repealed

Text of statute as originally enacted

Revised text of statute as amended

Text of the Landlord and Tenant Act 1709 as in force today (including any amendments) within the United Kingdom, from legislation.gov.uk.

The Landlord and Tenant Act 1709 (8 Ann. c. 18) is an act of the Parliament of Great Britain that regulates the relationship between tenants and their landlords.

As of 2025, the act was partly in force in England and Wales.

== Subsequent developments ==
Sections 2, 3 and 5 of the act were repealed by section 1 of, and the schedule to, the Statute Law Revision Act 1867 (30 & 31 Vict. c. 59), which came into force on 15 July 1867.
