= Bank of England Act 1708 =

Act of the Parliament of Great Britain

Bank of England Act 1708 (Note: The citation of this act by this short title was authorised by section 1 of, and the first schedule to, the Short Titles Act 1896. Due to the repeal of those provisions it is now authorised by section 19(2) of the Interpretation Act 1978.)
- Act of Parliament
- Parliament of Great Britain
- Long title: An Act for enlarging the Capital Stock of the Bank of England; (Note: These words are printed against this act in the second column of the first schedule to the Short Titles Act 1896, which is headed "Title".) and for raising a further Supply to Her Majesty, for the Service of the Year One Thousand Seven Hundred and Nine.
- Citation: 7 Ann. c. 30 (Note: This is the citation in The Statutes of the Realm.); 7 Ann. c. 7 (Note: This is the citation in The Statutes at Large.)
- Territorial extent: Great Britain

Dates
- Royal assent: 21 April 1709
- Commencement: 16 November 1708 (Note: Start of session.)
- Repealed: 30 July 1948
Other legislation
Amends	Bank of England Act 1694; Bank of England Act 1696
Amended by	Statute Law Revision Act 1867; Statute Law Revision Act 1887; Statute Law Revision Act 1888; Bank Act 1892
Repealed by	Statute Law Revision Act 1948

Status: Repealed

Text of statute as originally enacted

The Bank of England Act 1708 (7 Ann. c. 30) was an act of the Parliament of Great Britain. It was one of the Bank of England Acts 1694 to 1892.

This act is chapter 7 in Ruffhead's Edition and the old editions and chapter VII in common printed editions.

Sections 66 to 68 are sections 61 to 63 in Ruffhead's Edition.

== Subsequent developments ==
The act, except sections 1–5, 60, 61, 66–68, 70, 75 and 77, was repealed by section 1 of, and the schedule to, the Statute Law Revision Act 1867 (30 & 31 Vict. c. 59), which came into force on 15 July 1867.

== Title ==
The title, from "and for raising" to the end of the title, was repealed by section 1 of, and the schedule to, the Statute Law Revision Act 1887.

== Preamble ==
The preamble was repealed by section 8(3) of, and part I of the schedule to, the Bank Act 1892.

== Section 1 ==
This section was repealed by section 8(3) of, and part I of the schedule to, the Bank Act 1892.

== Section 2 ==
This section was repealed by section 8(3) of, and part I of the schedule to, the Bank Act 1892.

== Section 3 ==
This section was repealed by section 8(3) of, and part I of the schedule to, the Bank Act 1892.

== Section 4 ==
This section was repealed by section 8(3) of, and part I of the schedule to, the Bank Act 1892.

== Section 5 ==
This section is section 2 in Ruffhead's Edition. This section was repealed by section 8(3) of, and part I of the schedule to, the Bank Act 1892.

== Section 60 ==
This section is not printed in Ruffhead's Edition. This section was repealed by section 3(4) of, and schedule 3 to, the Bank of England Act 1946.

== Section 61 ==
This section was repealed by section 3(4) of, and schedule 3 to, the Bank of England Act 1946.

== Section 66 ==
This section was repealed by section 1 of, and schedule 1 to, the Statute Law Revision Act 1948.

== Section 67 ==
This section down to "persons, and that" and from "and the said allowances" down to "governor and company" and from "allowances and" down to "governor and company as aforesaid" was repealed by section 8(3) of, and part I of the schedule to, the Bank Act 1892. This section was repealed by section 1 of, and schedule 1 to, the Statute Law Revision Act 1948.

== Section 68 ==
This section was repealed by section 8(3) of, and part I of the schedule to, the Bank Act 1892.

== Section 70 ==
This section is section 65 in Ruffhead's Edition. This section was repealed by section 3(4) of, and schedule 3 to, the Bank of England Act 1946.

== Section 75 ==
This section is section 70 in Ruffhead's Edition. This section was repealed by section 1 of, and the schedule to, the Statute Law Revision Act 1887.

== Section 77 ==
This section is section 72 in Ruffhead's Edition. This section was repealed by section 3(4) of, and schedule 3 to, the Bank of England Act 1946.
