= Bank of England Act 1694 =

Act of the Parliament of England

Bank of England Act 1694 (Note: The citation of this act by this short title was authorised by section 1 of, and the first schedule to, the Short Titles Act 1896. Due to the repeal of those provisions it is now authorised by section 19(2) of the Interpretation Act 1978.)
- Act of Parliament
- Parliament of England
- Long title: An Act for granting to theire Majesties severall Rates and Duties upon Tunnage of Shipps and Vessells and upon Beere Ale and other Liquors for secureing certaine Recompenses and Advantages in the said Act mentioned to such Persons as shall voluntarily advance the sūme of Fifteene hundred thousand pounds towards the carrying on the Warr against France. (Note: These words are printed against this act in the second column of the first schedule to the Short Titles Act 1896, which is headed "Title".)
- Citation: 5 & 6 Will. & Mar. c. 20
- Territorial extent: England and Wales

Dates
- Royal assent: 25 April 1694
- Commencement: 1 June 1694 (Note: Section 1.)
Other legislation
Amended by	Bank of England Act 1708; Statute Law Revision Act 1867; Statute Law Revision Act 1888; Bank Act 1892; Short Titles Act 1896; Supreme Court of Judicature (Consolidation) Act 1925; Bank of England Act 1946; Statute Law Revision Act 1948; Common Informers Act 1951; Statute Law Revision Act 1966; Statute Law (Repeals) Act 1976

Status: Amended

Text of statute as originally enacted

Revised text of statute as amended

Text of the Bank of England Act 1694 as in force today (including any amendments) within the United Kingdom, from legislation.gov.uk.

The Bank of England Act 1694 (5 & 6 Will. & Mar. c. 20), sometimes referred to as the Tonnage Act 1694, is an act of the Parliament of England. It is one of the Bank of England Acts 1694 to 1892.

== Subsequent developments ==
Sections 1–15, 22–24 and 33 and 35–48 of the act were repealed by section 1 of, and the schedule to, the Statute Law Revision Act 1867 (30 & 31 Vict. c. 59), which came into force on 15 July 1867.

Sections 21 and 32–34 of the act were repealed by section 8 of, and part I of the schedule to, the Bank Act 1892 (55 & 56 Vict. c. 48).

Section 25 of the act was repealed by section 3(4) of, and the third schedule to, the Bank of England Act 1946 (9 & 10 Geo. 6. c. 27).

Sections 29–31 of the act were repealed by section 1 of, and the first schedule to, the Statute Law Revision Act 1948 (11 & 12 Geo. 6. c. 62), which came into force on 30 July 1948.

Sections 16 and 18 of the act were repealed by section 1 of, and the schedule to, the Statute Law Revision Act 1966, which came into force on 10 March 1966.

Section 28 of the act was repealed by section 1(1) of, and part XI of schedule 1 to, the Statute Law (Repeals) Act 1976, which came into force on 27 May 1976.
