= Bank of England Act 1709 =

Act of the Parliament of Great Britain

Bank of England Act 1709 (Note: The citation of this act by this short title was authorised by section 5 of, and the second schedule to, the Statute Law Revision Act 1948. Due to the repeal of those provisions, it is now authorised by section 19(2) of the Interpretation Act 1978.)
- Act of Parliament
- Parliament of Great Britain
- Long title: An Act for granting an Aid to Her Majesty to be raised by a Land Tax in Great Britain for the Service of the Year One thousand seven hundred and ten. (Note: These words are printed against this act in the second column of the first schedule to the Short Titles Act 1896, which is headed "Title".)
- Citation: 8 Ann. c. 1
- Territorial extent: Great Britain

Dates
- Royal assent: 10 December 1709
- Commencement: 15 November 1709 (Note: Start of session.)
- Repealed: 1 March 1946 (Note: The Bank of England (Appointed Day) Order 1946.)

Other legislation
- Amended by: Statute Law Revision Act 1867
- Repealed by: Bank of England Act 1946
- Relates to: Bank of England Act 1708

Status: Repealed

Text of statute as originally enacted

The Bank of England Act 1709 (8 Ann. c. 1) was an act of the Parliament of Great Britain. It was one of the Bank of England Acts 1694 to 1892.

Only the title of this act is printed in Ruffhead's Edition.

The majority of the act related to the raising of one year's land tax. Sections 124 to 132 (the last eight sections of the act) dealt with the Bank of England.

== Subsequent developments ==
The whole act, except sections 131 and 132, were repealed by section 1 of, and the schedule to, the Statute Law Revision Act 1867 (30 & 31 Vict. c. 59), which came into force on 15 July 1867.

The whole act was repealed by section 3(4) of, and schedule 3 to, the Bank of England Act 1946 (9 & 10 Geo. 6. c. 27), which came into force on 1 March 1946.
