= Bank of England Act 1946 =

Act of the Parliament of the United Kingdom that nationalised the Bank of England

Bank of England Act 1946 (Note: Section 6.)
- Act of Parliament
- Parliament of the United Kingdom
- Long title: An Act to bring the capital stock of the Bank of England into public ownership and bring the Bank under public control, to make provision with respect to the relations between the Treasury, the Bank of England and other banks and for purposes connected with the matters aforesaid.
- Citation: 9 & 10 Geo. 6. c. 27
- Introduced by: Hugh Dalton (Commons); Lord Pethick-Lawrence (Lords)
- Territorial extent: United Kingdom

Dates
- Royal assent: 14 February 1946
- Commencement: 1 March 1946 (Note: Section 5. The Bank of England (Appointed Day) Order 1946.)

Other legislation
- Amends: Bank of England Act 1694; Bank of England Act 1716; National Debt Act 1870
- Repeals/revokes: Bank of England Act 1709
- Amended by: Income Tax Act 1952; Statute Law Revision Act 1963; National Loans Act 1968; Statute Law (Repeals) Act 1976; Official Secrets Act 1989; Statute Law (Repeals) Act 1993; Bank of England Act 1998; Statute Law (Repeals) Act 2004; Bank of England and Financial Services Act 2016; Financial Services and Markets Act 2023

Status: Amended

Text of statute as originally enacted

Revised text of statute as amended

Text of the Bank of England Act 1946 as in force today (including any amendments) within the United Kingdom, from legislation.gov.uk.

The Bank of England Act 1946 (9 & 10 Geo. 6. c. 27) is an act of the Parliament of the United Kingdom which came into force on 14 February 1946. The act brought all of the stock of the Bank of England into public ownership on the "appointed date" (1 March 1946). The act was belonged to a series of nationalisations by the post-war Labour government led by Clement Attlee, which also contained the Coal Industry Nationalisation Act 1946, Electricity Act 1947 and Transport Act 1947.

== Provisions ==
The act nationalised the Bank of England without changing its internal structure.

=== Commencement ===
Section 5 of the act provided that the act would come into force on a day appointed by the treasury by statutory instruments.

The Bank of England (Appointed Day) Order 1946 (SR&O 1946/237) provided that the act would come into force on 1 March 1946.

== Further developments ==
The 1946 act was largely replaced by the Bank of England Act 1998.

Bank of England (Appointed Day) Order 1946 (Note: Section 2.)
- Statutory Rules and Orders
- Parliament of the United Kingdom
- Citation: SR&O 1946/237
- Introduced by: Hugh Dalton; Joseph Henderson; (Commons)
- Territorial extent: United Kingdom

Dates
- Made: 18 February 1946
- Commencement: 1 March 1946 (Note: Section 1.)

Other legislation
- Made under: Bank of England Act 1946

Status: Current legislation

Text of statute as originally enacted

== See also ==
- Bank of England Act 1716
- Bank of England Act 1998
