= Gunthorpe =

Gunthorpe may refer to the following places in England:

- Gunthorpe ward in Peterborough, Cambridgeshire, population 9400.
- Gunthorpe village in Nottinghamshire, population 740, site of Gunthorpe Bridge over the River Trent.
- Gunthorpe village in Norfolk, population 230, site of Gunthorpe Hall.
- Gunthorpe hamlet in the parish of Owston Ferry, Lincolnshire, population 180, sited on the bank of the River Trent.
- Gunthorpe hamlet in Rutland, population 21.
