= Gunthorpe, Nottinghamshire =

Riverside village in Nottinghamshire, England

Coordinates: 52.990°N 0.987°W

Gunthorpe
- Village and civil parish
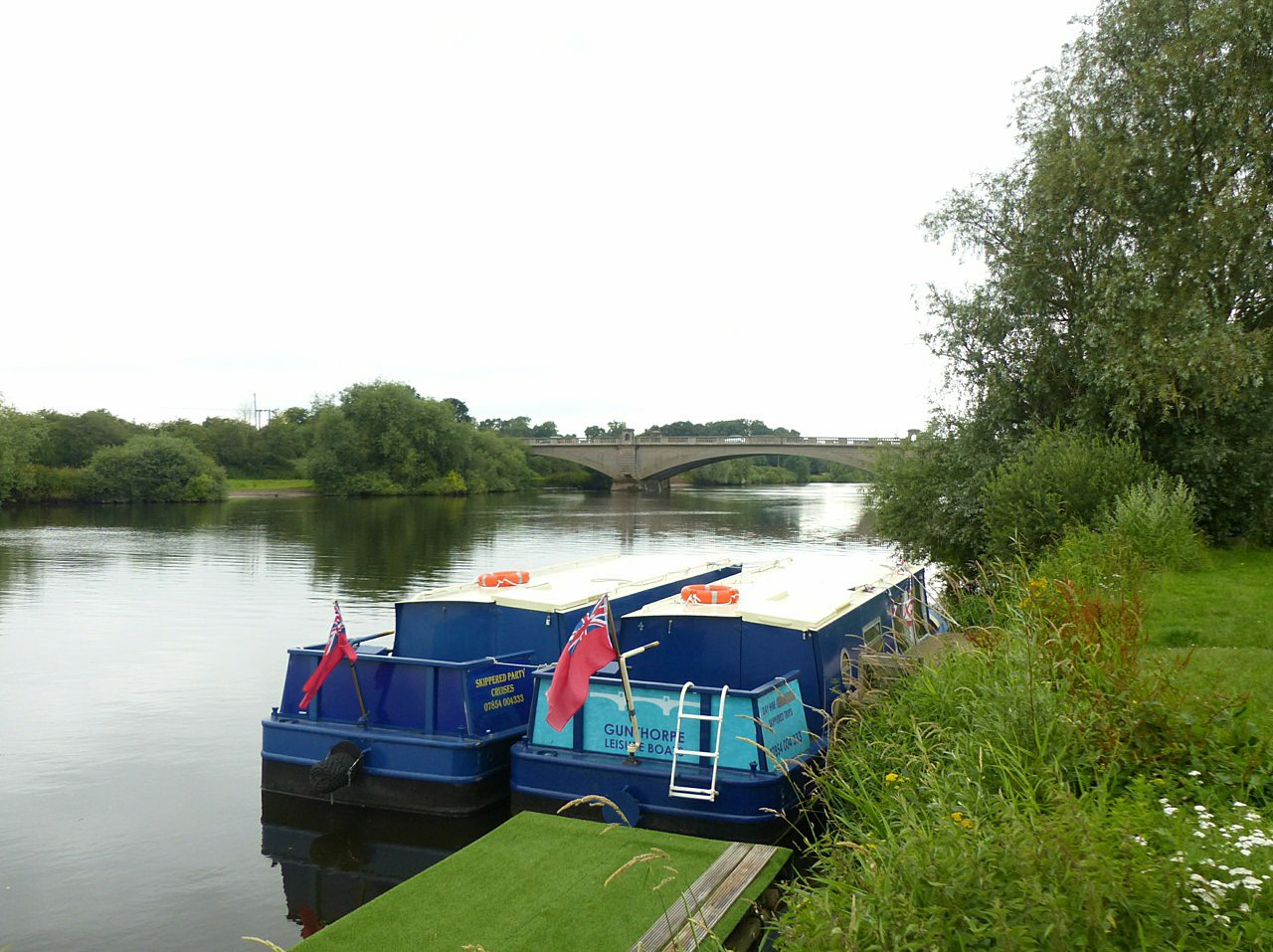
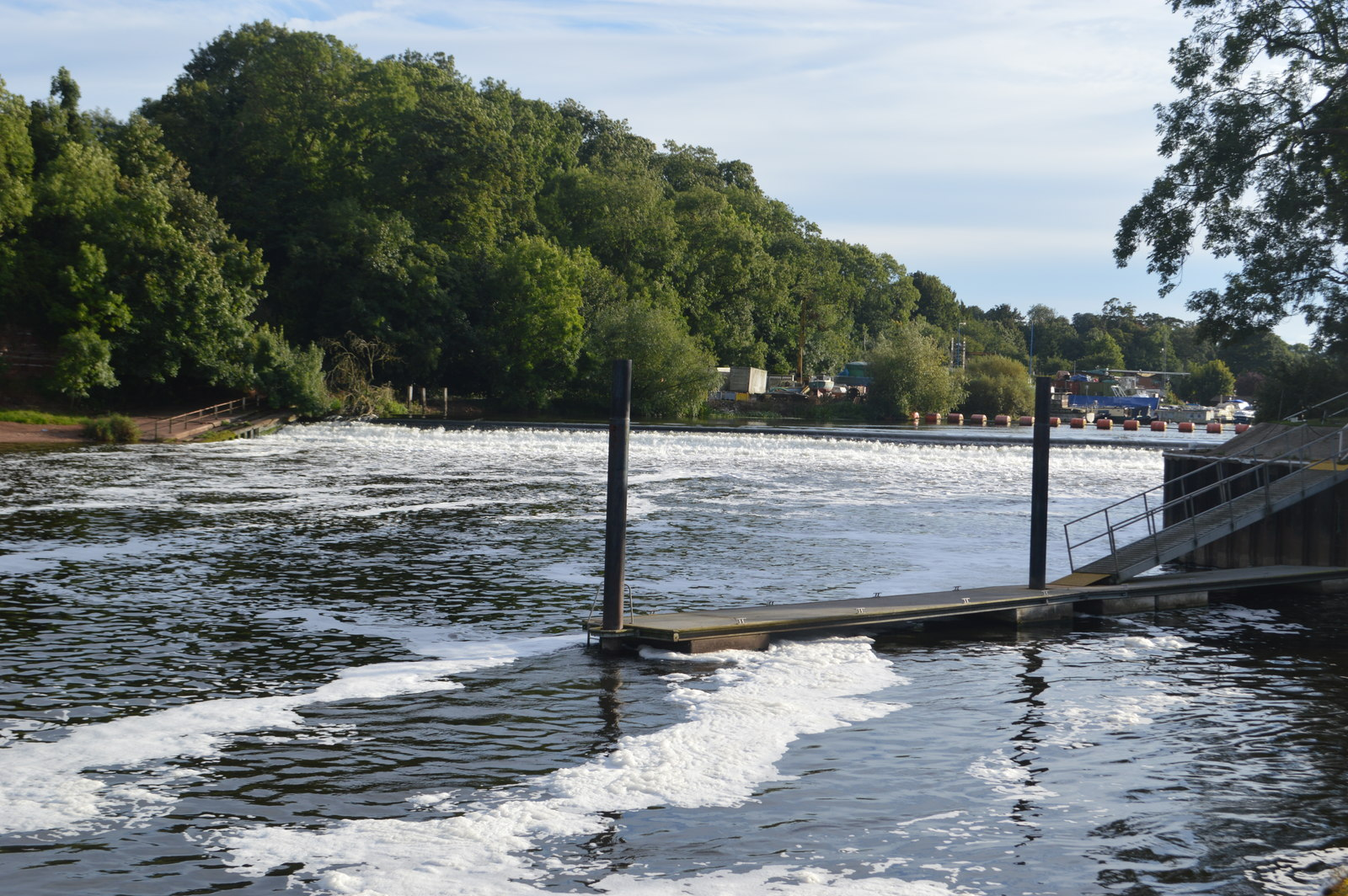
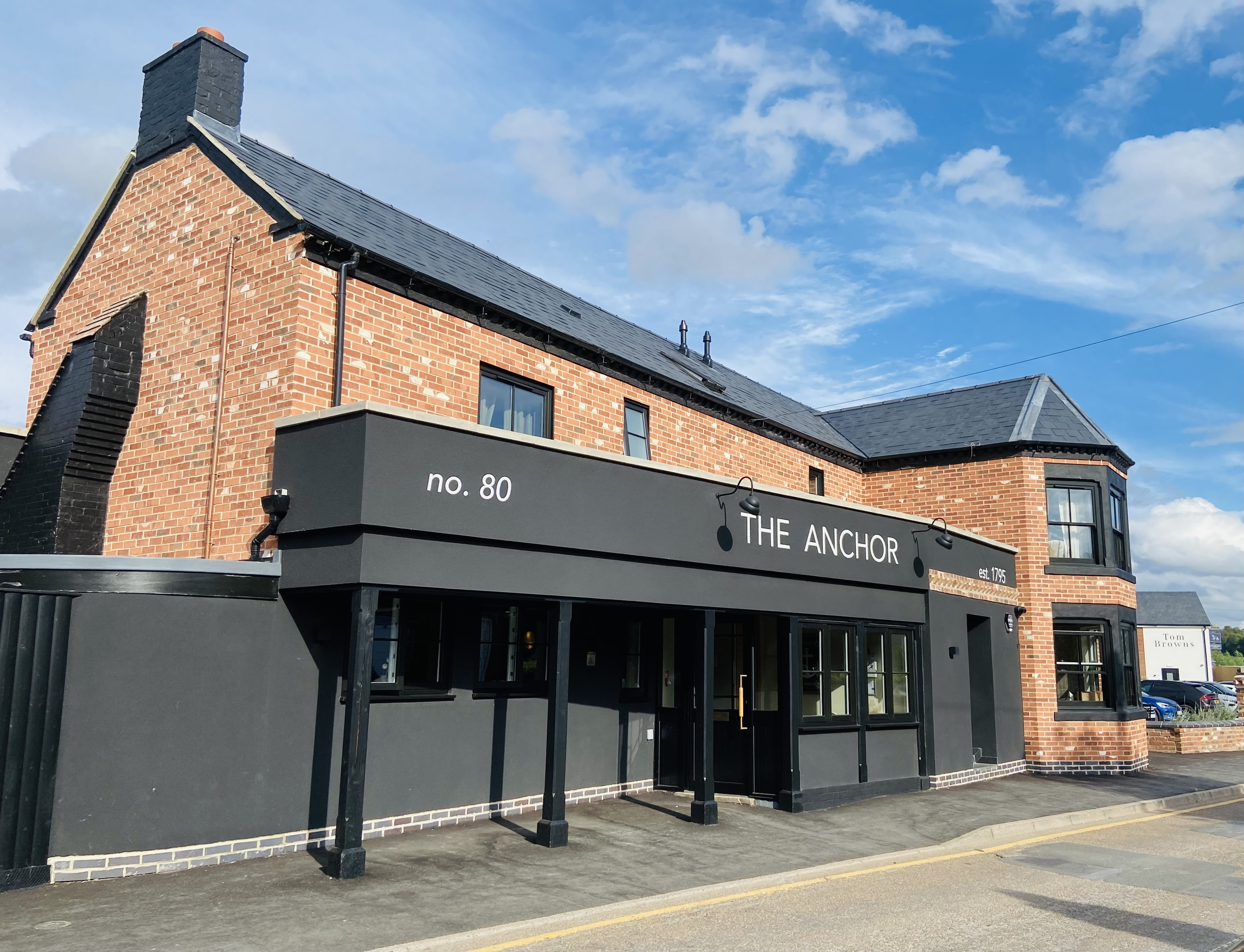
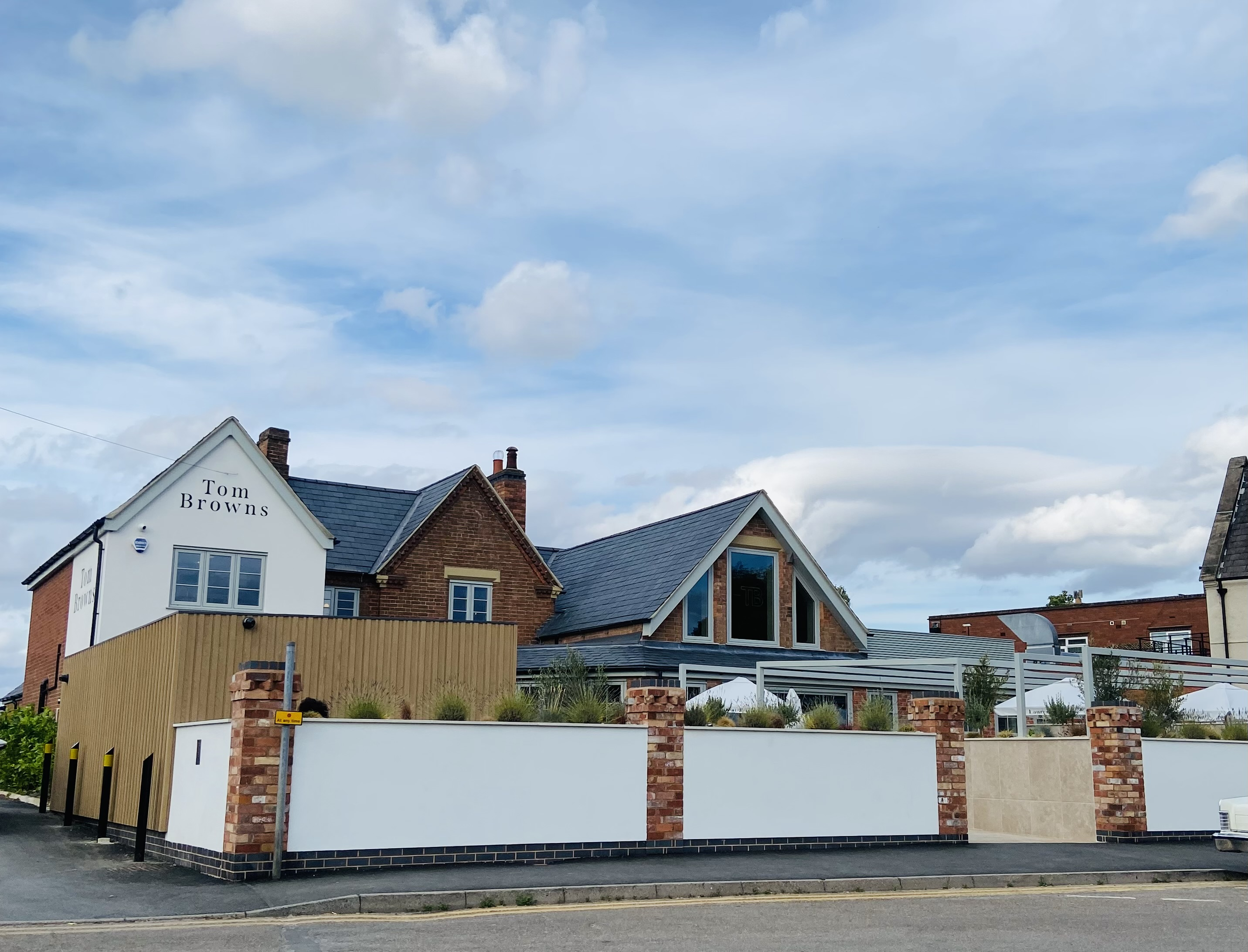
- Gunthorpe Bridge The Weir The Anchor Tom Browns

- Location within Nottinghamshire
- Interactive map of Gunthorpe
- Area: 1.76 sq mi (4.6 km^{2})
- Population: 740 (2021)
  - Density: 420/sq mi (160/km^{2})
- OS grid reference: SK 680441
  - London: 110 mi (180 km) SSE
- District: Newark and Sherwood
- Shire county: Nottinghamshire
- Region: East Midlands
- Country: England
- Sovereign state: United Kingdom
- Post town: NOTTINGHAM
- Postcode district: NG14
- Dialling code: 0115
- Police: Nottinghamshire
- Fire: Nottinghamshire
- Ambulance: East Midlands
- UK Parliament: Newark
- Website: gunthorpenottspc.org.uk

Gunthorpe is a village and civil parish in Nottinghamshire, England. Its population was 740 at the 2021 census. It lies on the left bank of the River Trent. Gunthorpe Bridge on the A6097 is the only road crossing of the river between Newark and Nottingham. It is one of five places in England with the same name.

== Origin of the name Gunthorpe ==
The name Gunthorpe refers not to guns but to a Viking woman. Gunnhildr was a common Viking female name, notably in the family of King Cnut, and could be shortened to Gunni. The name Gunthorpe combines Gunnhildr with the Old Norse element þorp meaning ‘outlying farm/settlement’.

The surname Gunthorpe developed later, being first recorded in Northumberland in 1207. The most eminent bearer was John Gunthorpe (c1449-1498), Dean of Wells, who probably took his name from Gunthorpe in Lincolnshire, where he owned land.

== History ==
The significance of the river crossing at Gunthorpe is indicated by the presence of a buried earthwork of 53m diameter surrounded by a ditch and bank, believed to be a “henge”, a ceremonial centre from the late Neolithic or early Bronze Age (2800-2000 BC). It is one of only about 80 examples in the country. The henge is on private land east of the A6097. It was detected by aerial survey in 1996 and scheduled as an ancient monument in 1998.

The Roman Fosse Way from Exeter to Lincoln followed the high ground to the east of the River Trent. From the nearest fort at Margidunum near Bingham, a road led to a ford across the river at what is now East Bridgford but there is no evidence of any continuation on the Gunthorpe side.

The Old Norse origin of the name suggests that the settlement of Gunthorpe originated in the Danelaw period. The Viking Great Army sailed up this part of the River Trent in 873. The shallow water at Gunthorpe would have been a significant obstacle on the way. A treaty with the Anglo-Saxon King Alfred the Great established Viking rule over the Danelaw, and Gunthorpe became part of the Viking Borough of Nottingham.

The Domesday Book of 1086 recorded Gunthorpe (then spelled “Gulnhorp”) as a substantial settlement. It had 52 households, compared to 165 in Nottingham, 39 in Newark and 3 in Lowdham, putting Gunthorpe among the largest 20% of recorded settlements.

A ferry boat across the river at Gunthorpe existed since before the Norman conquest, as mentioned in the Domesday Book and several Medieval and later references.

In the Late Middle Ages, Gunthorpe’s status declined compared to the neighbouring villages of Lowdham and East Bridgford, which had roads and churches on higher ground above the river floodplain. In 1559 the parish register of Lowdham recorded that there was a chapel of ease at Gunthorpe. It suffered from vandalism and theft, and stones from it appear to form the foundations of the cottage opposite (now No 37 Main Street). By 1798 the chapel had been converted to a blacksmith’s shop.

An iron toll bridge over the River Trent between Gunthorpe and East Bridgford opened in 1875. The toll house is now the Bridge & Bayleaf restaurant.

In 1881 the population of Gunthorpe was 323, including 40 attending the church school. The village had two inns, two shops, three farmers, a blacksmith, a wheelwright, a tailor and a shoe maker. The chief crops were wheat, barley, beans, turnips and roots. Most people were employed in framework knitting.

Of the 58 men of Gunthorpe who served in the First World War, 12 were killed. Of the 66 who served in the Second World War, 2 were killed.

The modern riverside was constructed during the 1920s. Gunthorpe lock was excavated during 1922-25 as a job creation scheme. It was one of six locks of similar size on the river between Nottingham and Newark. The associated weir created deeper water in the river allowing the passage of larger barges to Nottingham. A new concrete bridge over the river was completed in 1927, served by a by-pass road whose embankment used the spoil from the lock excavation.

== Amenities ==
Gunthorpe's Anglican church, St John the Baptist's, was originally a chapel of ease built in 1850. It became a parish in its own right, separate from Lowdham, in 1993. Extensions were made in 1991 and 2001. A service is held only on the morning of the second Sunday in the month.

Gunthorpe Church of England Primary School is in David's Lane just off Main Street. The school was established in 1873 in a riverfront building now occupied by Tom Brown’s restaurant and moved to the present site in 1974.

The Unicorn Hotel on Gunthorpe river front was first recorded as an alehouse in 1695, whose proprietor was also responsible for the ferry across the river. Originally known as the Ferry House, it became the Unicorn Ferry House by 1855.

The Anchor Inn, Gunthorpe’s second public house, was first recorded in 1795. In 2009 it was converted to an Italian restaurant, Pontefino, and later Mediterraneo, which closed in 2017. In 2025 it reopened as a public house and café.

Tom Brown’s restaurant opened in 1986 on the former site of Gunthorpe Primary School.

The Bridge & Bayleaf restaurant opened in 2010. It was formerly the Lighthouse Café, and is the toll house of the first Gunthorpe Bridge.

There was a post office and shop in Gunthorpe since before 1891. From 1924 it was owned by HW Spouge (sited in the present Bramley Close), which closed in 1994. The post office moved to 74 Main Street, where it closed in 1999.

== Flooding ==
The location of Gunthorpe on the River Trent floodplain bordered by the river and its tributary the Cocker Beck makes it vulnerable to flooding. Large parts of the village are within Flood Zone 3, with more than a 1% chance of flooding each year.

The highest floods recorded by the river level gauge at Gunthorpe weir since 2016 were:

- Storm Dennis, February 2020, gauge level 2.5 m (1.8 m above the year-round average river level during 2016-24).
- Storm Christoph, January 2021, gauge level 2.9 m (2.2 m above average).
- Storm Henk, January 2024, gauge level 2.8 m (2.1 m above average). One property reported internal flooding from the river, while ten other properties reported internal flooding attributed to rising ground water.

== Transport ==
The daytime Trent Barton "Rushcliffe Villager" service links Gunthorpe with Nottingham and Bingham about once an hour on Monday to Saturday.

The nearest railway station is at Lowdham, just over a mile away. This has regular services to Nottingham and Newark and beyond.
