= List of acts of the Parliament of the United Kingdom from 1870 =

This is a complete list of acts of the Parliament of the United Kingdom for the year 1870.

Note that the first parliament of the United Kingdom was held in 1801; parliaments between 1707 and 1800 were either parliaments of Great Britain or of Ireland). For acts passed up until 1707, see the list of acts of the Parliament of England and the list of acts of the Parliament of Scotland. For acts passed from 1707 to 1800, see the list of acts of the Parliament of Great Britain. See also the list of acts of the Parliament of Ireland.

For acts of the devolved parliaments and assemblies in the United Kingdom, see the list of acts of the Scottish Parliament, the list of acts of the Northern Ireland Assembly, and the list of acts and measures of Senedd Cymru; see also the list of acts of the Parliament of Northern Ireland.

The number shown after each act's title is its chapter number. Acts passed before 1963 are cited using this number, preceded by the year(s) of the reign during which the relevant parliamentary session was held; thus the Union with Ireland Act 1800 is cited as "39 & 40 Geo. 3 c. 67", meaning the 67th act passed during the session that started in the 39th year of the reign of George III and which finished in the 40th year of that reign. Note that the modern convention is to use Arabic numerals in citations (thus "41 Geo. 3" rather than "41 Geo. III"). Acts of the last session of the Parliament of Great Britain and the first session of the Parliament of the United Kingdom are both cited as "41 Geo. 3".

Some of these acts have a short title. Some of these acts have never had a short title. Some of these acts have a short title given to them by later acts, such as by the Short Titles Act 1896.

== 33 & 34 Vict. ==
The second session of the 20th Parliament of the United Kingdom, which met from 8 February 1870 until 10 August 1870.

=== Public general acts ===
Short title	Citation	Royal assent
Long title
Bills Confirming Provisional Orders Act 1870 (repealed)	33 & 34 Vict. c. 1	25 March 1870
An Act to empower Committees on Bills confirming Provisional Orders to award Costs and examine Witnesses on Oath. (Repealed by Parliamentary Costs Act 1871 (34 & 35 Vict. c. 3))
Dissolved Boards of Management and Guardians Act 1870 (repealed)	33 & 34 Vict. c. 2	25 March 1870
An Act to make provision for the proceedings of Boards of Management and Boards of Guardians upon the dissolution of Districts and Unions or the annexation of Parishes to Unions. (Repealed by Poor Law Act 1927 (17 & 18 Geo. 5. c. 14))
Government of India Act 1870 (repealed)	33 & 34 Vict. c. 3	25 March 1870
An Act to make better provision for making laws and regulations for certain parts of India, and for certain other purposes relating thereto. (Repealed by Government of India Act 1915 (5 & 6 Geo. 5. c. 61))
Income Tax Assessment Act 1870 (repealed)	33 & 34 Vict. c. 4	25 March 1870
An Act to make provision for the assessment of Income Tax, and to amend the law relating to Inland Revenue. (Repealed by Taxes Management Act 1880 (43 & 44 Vict. c. 19))
Consolidated Fund (£9,564,191 7s. 2d.) Act or the Supply Act 1870 (repealed)	33 & 34 Vict. c. 5	25 March 1870
An Act to apply certain sums out of the Consolidated Fund to the service of the years ending on the thirty-first day of March one thousand eight hundred and sixty-nine, one thousand eight hundred and seventy, and one thousand eight hundred and seventy-one, and preceding years. (Repealed by Statute Law Revision Act 1883 (46 & 47 Vict. c. 39))
Judges Jurisdiction Act 1870 (repealed)	33 & 34 Vict. c. 6	25 March 1870
An Act to extend the Jurisdiction of the Judges of the Superior Courts of Common Law at Westminster. (Repealed by Statute Law Revision and Civil Procedure Act 1881 (44 & 45 Vict. c. 59))
Mutiny Act 1870 (repealed)	33 & 34 Vict. c. 7	4 April 1870
An Act for punishing Mutiny and Desertion, and for the better payment of the Army and their Quarters. (Repealed by Statute Law Revision Act 1883 (46 & 47 Vict. c. 39))
Marine Mutiny Act 1870 (repealed)	33 & 34 Vict. c. 8	4 April 1870
An Act for the Regulation of Her Majesty's Royal Marine Forces while on shore. (Repealed by Statute Law Revision Act 1883 (46 & 47 Vict. c. 39))
Peace Preservation (Ireland) Act 1870 (repealed)	33 & 34 Vict. c. 9	4 April 1870
An Act to amend "The Peace Preservation (Ireland) Act, 1856" (Note: Peace Preservation (Ireland) Act 1856 (19 & 20 Vict. c. 36)) and for other purposes relating to the Preservation of Peace in Ireland. (Repealed by Statute Law Revision Act 1883 (46 & 47 Vict. c. 39))
Coinage Act 1870 (repealed)	33 & 34 Vict. c. 10	4 April 1870
An Act to consolidate and amend the law relating to the Coinage and Her Majesty’s Mint. (Repealed by Coinage Act 1971 (c. 24))
Dublin Collector-General of Rates Act 1870 (repealed)	33 & 34 Vict. c. 11	12 May 1870
An Act to enable the officers employed in the Collector-General of Rates' office in the city of Dublin to vote at Parliamentary Elections for that city. (Repealed by Representation of the People Act 1918 (7 & 8 Geo. 5. c. 64))
Customs (Isle of Man) Act 1870 (repealed)	33 & 34 Vict. c. 12	12 May 1870
An Act to repeal certain Duties of Customs in the Isle of Man. (Repealed by Customs Consolidation Act 1876 (39 & 40 Vict. c. 36))
Survey Act 1870 (repealed)	33 & 34 Vict. c. 13	12 May 1870
An Act to amend the Law relating to the Surveys of Great Britain, Ireland, and the Isle of Man. (Repealed by Statute Law (Repeals) Act 1989 (c. 43))
Naturalization Act 1870 (repealed)	33 & 34 Vict. c. 14	12 May 1870
An Act to amend the Law relating to the legal condition of Aliens and British Subjects. (Repealed by British Nationality and Status of Aliens Act 1914 (4 & 5 Geo. 5. c. 17))
County Court (Buildings) Act 1870 (repealed)	33 & 34 Vict. c. 15	20 June 1870
An Act to transfer to the Commissioners of Her Majesty's Works and Public Buildings the property in and control over the buildings and property of the County Courts in England, and for other purposes relating thereto. (Repealed by County Courts Act 1934 (24 & 25 Geo. 5. c. 53))
Inverness and Elgin County Boundaries Act 1870	33 & 34 Vict. c. 16	20 June 1870
An Act to define the boundary between the counties of Inverness and Elgin or Moray, in the district of Strathspey; and for other purposes.
War Office Act 1870 (repealed)	33 & 34 Vict. c. 17	20 June 1870
An Act far making further provision relating to the Management of certain Departments of the War Office. (Repealed by Defence (Transfer of Functions) (No. 1) Order 1964 (SI 1964/488))
Metropolitan Poor Amendment Act 1870 (repealed)	33 & 34 Vict. c. 18	20 June 1870
An Act to provide for the equal distribution over the Metropolis of a further portion of the charge for the Relief of the Poor. (Repealed by Poor Law Act 1927 (17 & 18 Geo. 5. c. 14))
Railways (Powers and Construction) Acts 1864, Amendment Act 1870 (repealed)	33 & 34 Vict. c. 19	20 June 1870
An Act to amend the Railway Companies Powers Act, 1864, (Note: Railway Companies' Powers Act 1864 (27 & 28 Vict. c. 120)) and the Railway Companies Facilities Act, 1864. (Note: Railways Construction Facilities Act 1864 (27 & 28 Vict. c. 121)) (Repealed by Statute Law Revision Act 1883 (46 & 47 Vict. c. 39) and Statute Law Revision Act 1953 (2 & 3 Eliz. 2. c. 5))
Mortgage Debenture (Amendment) Act 1870 (repealed)	33 & 34 Vict. c. 20	4 July 1870
An Act to amend "The Mortgage Debenture Act, 1865." (Note: Mortgage Debenture Act 1865 (28 & 29 Vict. c. 78)) (Repealed by Statute Law Revision Act 1958 (6 & 7 Eliz. 2. c. 46))
Bridgwater and Beverley Disfranchisement Act 1870 (repealed)	33 & 34 Vict. c. 21	4 July 1870
An Act to disfranchise the Boroughs of Bridgwater and Beverley. (Repealed by Statute Law Revision (No. 2) Act 1893 (56 & 57 Vict. c. 54))
Turnpikes Provisional Orders Confirmation Act 1870 (repealed)	33 & 34 Vict. c. 22	4 July 1870
An Act to confirm a certain Provisional Order made under an Act of the fifteenth year of Her present Majesty, to facilitate arrangements for the relief of Turnpike Trusts. (Repealed by Statute Law (Repeals) Act 1981 (c. 19))
Forfeiture Act 1870 or the Abolition of Forfeiture Act 1870 or the Felony Act 1870	33 & 34 Vict. c. 23	4 July 1870
An Act to abolish Forfeitures for Treason and Felony, and to otherwise amend the Law relating thereto.
Metropolitan Board of Works (Loans) Act 1870 (repealed)	33 & 34 Vict. c. 24	4 July 1870
An Act for making further provision respecting the borrowing of money by the Metropolitan Board of Works. (Repealed by London County Council (Finance Consolidation) Act 1912 (2 & 3 Geo. 5. c. cv))
Norwich Voters Disfranchisement Act 1870 (repealed)	33 & 34 Vict. c. 25	4 July 1870
An Act to disfranchise certain Voters of the City of Norwich. (Repealed by Redistribution of Seats Act 1885 (48 & 49 Vict. c. 23))
Poisons (Ireland) Act 1870 (repealed)	33 & 34 Vict. c. 26	14 July 1870
An Act to regulate the Sale of Poisons in Ireland. (Repealed for Northern Ireland by Medicines, Pharmacy and Poisons Act (Northern Ireland) 1945 (c. 9 (N.I.)) and for the Republic of Ireland by Poisons Act 1961 (No. 12 (I)))
Protection of Inventions Act 1870 (repealed)	33 & 34 Vict. c. 27	14 July 1870
An Act for the Protection of Inventions exhibited at International Exhibitions in the United Kingdom. (Repealed by Patents, Designs, and Trade Marks Act 1883 (46 & 47 Vict. c. 57))
Attorneys' and Solicitors' Act 1870 (repealed)	33 & 34 Vict. c. 28	14 July 1870
An Act to amend the law relating to the Remuneration of Attorneys and Solicitors. (Repealed by Senior Courts Act 1981 (c. 54))
Wine and Beerhouse Act Amendment Act 1870 or the Wine and Beerhouse Amendment Act 1870 (repealed)	33 & 34 Vict. c. 29	14 July 1870
An Act to amend and continue "The Wine and Beerhouse Act, 1869." (Note: Wine and Beerhouse Act 1869 (32 & 33 Vict. c. 27)) (Repealed by Licensing (Consolidation) Act 1910 (10 Edw. 7 & 1 Geo. 5. c. 24))
Wages Attachment Abolition Act 1870 (repealed)	33 & 34 Vict. c. 30	14 July 1870
An Act to abolish Attachment of Wages. (Repealed for Northern Ireland by Judgments (Enforcement) Act (Northern Ireland) 1969 (c. 30 (N.I.)) and for England and Wales and Scotland by Statute Law (Repeals) Act 1976 (c. 16))
Consolidated Fund (£9,000,000) Act or the Supply Act 1870 (repealed)	33 & 34 Vict. c. 31	1 August 1870
An Act to apply the sum of nine million pounds out of the Consolidated Fund to the service of the year ending the thirty-first day of March one thousand eight hundred and seventy-one. (Repealed by Statute Law Revision Act 1883 (46 & 47 Vict. c. 39))
Customs and Inland Revenue Act 1870 (repealed)	33 & 34 Vict. c. 32	1 August 1870
An Act to grant certain Duties of Customs and Inland Revenue, and to repeal and alter other Duties of Customs and Inland Revenue. (Repealed by Finance Act 1949 (12, 13 & 14 Geo. 6. c. 47))
Salmon Acts Amendment Act 1870 (repealed)	33 & 34 Vict. c. 33	1 August 1870
An Act to amend the Acts relating to the Export of unseasonable Salmon. (Repealed by Salmon Act 1986 (c. 62))
Charitable Funds Investment Act 1870 (repealed)	33 & 34 Vict. c. 34	1 August 1870
An Act to amend the Law as to the Investment on Real Securities of Trust Funds held for public and charitable purposes. (Repealed for England and Wales and Scotland by Charities Act 1960 (8 & 9 Eliz. 2. c. 58) and for Northern Ireland by Charities Act (Northern Ireland) 1964 (c. 33 (N.I.)))
Apportionment Act 1870	33 & 34 Vict. c. 35	1 August 1870
An Act for the better Apportionment of Rents and other periodical Payments.
Cattle Disease (Ireland) Amendment Act 1870 (repealed)	33 & 34 Vict. c. 36	1 August 1870
An Act to amend "The Cattle Disease Act (Ireland), 1866." (Note: Cattle Disease Act (Ireland) 1866 (29 & 30 Vict. c. 4)) (Repealed by Contagious Diseases (Animals) Act 1878 (41 & 42 Vict. c. 74))
Magistrates (Scotland) Act 1870 (repealed)	33 & 34 Vict. c. 37	1 August 1870
An Act to enable the senior Magistrate of populous Places in Scotland to act ex officio as a Justice of the Peace and Commissioner of Supply for the County in which the said populous Place is situated. (Repealed by Statute Law Revision (No. 2) Act 1893 (56 & 57 Vict. c. 54) and Local Government (Scotland) Act 1947 (10 & 11 Geo. 6. c. 43))
Sligo and Cashel Disfranchisement Act 1870 (repealed)	33 & 34 Vict. c. 38	1 August 1870
An Act to disfranchise the Boroughs of Sligo and Cashel. (Repealed by Statute Law Revision (No. 2) Act 1893 (56 & 57 Vict. c. 54))
Church Patronage Act 1870 (repealed)	33 & 34 Vict. c. 39	1 August 1870
An Act to facilitate transfers of Ecclesiastical Patronage in certain cases. (Repealed by Patronage (Benefices) Measure 1986 (No. 3))
New Zealand (Roads, &c.) Loan Act 1870 (repealed)	33 & 34 Vict. c. 40	1 August 1870
An Act for authorising a guarantee of a loan to be raised by the Government of New Zealand for the construction of roads, bridges, and communications in that country, and for the introduction of settlers into that country. (Repealed by New Zealand (Roads, &c.) Loan Act 1873 (36 & 37 Vict. c. 15) and Statute Law Revision Act 1950 (14 Geo. 6. c. 6))
Exchequer Bonds Act 1870 (repealed)	33 & 34 Vict. c. 41	1 August 1870
An Act for raising the sum of one million three hundred thousand pounds by Exchequer Bonds for the service of the year ending on the thirty-first day of March one thousand eight hundred and seventy-one. (Repealed by Statute Law Revision Act 1883 (46 & 47 Vict. c. 39))
Burgh Customs (Scotland) Act 1870	33 & 34 Vict. c. 42	1 August 1870
An Act to empower Magistrates and town councils of burghs in Scotland to abolish petty customs and to levy a rate in lieu thereof.
Customs Refined Sugar Duties (Isle of Man) Act 1870 (repealed)	33 & 34 Vict. c. 43	1 August 1870
An Act to alter certain Duties of Customs upon Refined Sugar in the Isle of Man. (Repealed by Customs Sugar Duties (Isle of Man) Act 1873 (36 & 37 Vict. c. 29))
Stamp Duty on Certain Leases Act 1870 (repealed)	33 & 34 Vict. c. 44	1 August 1870
An Act to declare the Stamp Duty chargeable on certain Leases. (Repealed by Statute Law Revision Act 1883 (46 & 47 Vict. c. 39))
Liverpool Admiralty District Registrar's Act 1870 (repealed)	33 & 34 Vict. c. 45	1 August 1870
An Act for establishing a District Registrar of the High Court of Admiralty in England at Liverpool. (Repealed by Statute Law Revision Act 1883 (46 & 47 Vict. c. 39))
Landlord and Tenant (Ireland) Act 1870 (repealed)	33 & 34 Vict. c. 46	1 August 1870
An Act to amend the Law relating to the Occupation and Ownership of Land in Ireland. (Repealed by Property (Northern Ireland) Order 1997 (SI 1997/1179))
Dividends and Stock Act 1870 (repealed)	33 & 34 Vict. c. 47	1 August 1870
An Act for extending to Ireland and amending "The Dividends and Stock Act, 1869." (Repealed by Statute Law Revision Act 1870 (33 & 34 Vict. c. 69))
Paupers Conveyance (Expenses) Act 1870 or the Pauper Conveyance (Expenses) Act 1870 (repealed)	33 & 34 Vict. c. 48	9 August 1870
An Act for removing doubts respecting the payment of Expenses incurred in the Conveyance of Paupers in certain cases not expressly provided for by Law. (Repealed by Poor Law Act 1927 (17 & 18 Geo. 5. c. 14))
Evidence Amendment Act 1870 (repealed)	33 & 34 Vict. c. 49	9 August 1870
An Act to explain and amend "the Evidence Further Amendment Act, 1869." (Note: Evidence Further Amendment Act 1869 (32 & 33 Vict. c. 68)) (Repealed by Oaths Act 1888 (51 & 52 Vict. c. 46))
Shipping Dues Exemption Act 1870 (repealed)	33 & 34 Vict. c. 50	9 August 1870
An Act to amend "The Shipping Dues Exemption Act, 1867." (Note: Shipping Dues Exemption Act 1867 (30 & 31 Vict. c. 15)) (Repealed by Statute Law Revision Act 1883 (46 & 47 Vict. c. 39))
Notice Act (Isle of Man) Repeal Act 1870 (repealed)	33 & 34 Vict. c. 51	9 August 1870
An Act to repeal an Act intituled "An Act to alter the mode of giving Notices for the holding of Vestries, of making Proclamation in cases of Outlawry, and of giving Notices on Sundays in respect to various matters," (Note: Parish Notices Act 1837 (7 Will. 4 & 1 Vict. c. 45)) so far as such Act relates to the Isle of Man. (Repealed by Statute Law Revision Act 1883 (46 & 47 Vict. c. 39))
Extradition Act 1870 (repealed)	33 & 34 Vict. c. 52	9 August 1870
An Act for amending the Law relating to the Extradition of Criminals. (Repealed by Extradition Act 1989 (c. 33))
Sanitary Act 1870 (repealed)	33 & 34 Vict. c. 53	9 August 1870
An Act to amend certain provisions in the Sanitary and Sewage Utilization Acts. (Repealed by Public Health Act 1875 (38 & 39 Vict. c. 55) and Public Health (London) Act 1891 (54 & 55 Vict. c. 76))
Dublin Voters Disfranchisement Act 1870 (repealed)	33 & 34 Vict. c. 54	9 August 1870
An Act to disfranchise certain Voters of the City of Dublin. (Repealed by Redistribution of Seats Act 1885 (48 & 49 Vict. c. 23))
Siam and Straits Settlements Jurisdiction Act 1870 or the Siam and Straits Settlement Jurisdiction Act 1870 (repealed)	33 & 34 Vict. c. 55	9 August 1870
An Act to vest Jurisdiction in matters arising within the Dominions of the Kings of Siam in the Supreme Court of the Straits Settlements. (Repealed by Foreign Jurisdiction Act 1890 (53 & 54 Vict. c. 37))
Limited Owners Residences Act 1870 (repealed)	33 & 34 Vict. c. 56	9 August 1870
An Act to enable the owners of Settled Estates in England and Ireland to charge such estates, within certain limits, with the expense of building mansions as residences for themselves. (Repealed by Abolition of Feudal Tenure etc. (Scotland) Act 2000 (asp 5))
Gun Licence Act 1870 (repealed)	33 & 34 Vict. c. 57	9 August 1870
An Act to grant a Duty of Excise on Licences to use Guns. (Repealed for England and Wales by Local Government Act 1966 (c. 42), for Scotland by Local Government (Scotland) Act 1966 (c. 51) and for Northern Ireland by Statute Law Revision (No. 2) Act 1893 (56 & 57 Vict. c. 54), Customs and Excise Act 1952 (15 & 16 Geo. 6 & 1 Eliz. 2. c. 44) and Miscellaneous Transferred Excise Duties Act (Northern Ireland) 1953 (c. 24 (N.I.)))
Forgery Act 1870 (repealed)	33 & 34 Vict. c. 58	9 August 1870
An Act to further amend the Law relating to indictable offences by Forgery. (Repealed for England and Wales and Scotland by Statute Law Revision (No. 2) Act 1893 (56 & 57 Vict. c. 54), Forgery Act 1913 (3 & 4 Geo. 5. c. 27) and Theft Act 1968 (c. 60) and for Northern Ireland by Statute Law Revision (No. 2) Act 1893 (56 & 57 Vict. c. 54), Forgery Act 1913 (3 & 4 Geo. 5. c. 27) and Theft Act (Northern Ireland) 1969 (c. 16 (N.I.)))
East India Contracts Act 1870 (repealed)	33 & 34 Vict. c. 59	9 August 1870
An Act to render valid certain Contracts informally executed in India. (Repealed by Government of India Act 1915 (5 & 6 Geo. 5. c. 61))
London Brokers Relief Act 1870 (repealed)	33 & 34 Vict. c. 60	9 August 1870
An Act to relieve the Brokers of the City of London from the supervision of the Court of Mayor and Aldermen of the said City. (Repealed by Statute Law Revision (No. 2) Act 1893 (56 & 57 Vict. c. 54))
Life Assurance Companies Act 1870 or the Life Assurance Act 1870 (repealed)	33 & 34 Vict. c. 61	9 August 1870
An Act to amend the law relating to Life Assurance Companies. (Repealed by Assurance Companies Act 1909 (9 Edw. 7. c. 49))
Factory and Workshop Act 1870 (repealed)	33 & 34 Vict. c. 62	9 August 1870
An Act to amend and extend the Acts relating to Factories and Workshops. (Repealed by Factory and Workshop Act 1878 (41 & 42 Vict. c. 16))
Wages Arrestment Limitation (Scotland) Act 1870 (repealed)	33 & 34 Vict. c. 63	9 August 1870
An Act to limit Wages Arrestment in Scotland. (Repealed by Debtors (Scotland) Act 1987 (c. 18))
Petty Sessions Clerk (Ireland) Act 1858 Amendment Act 1870 (repealed)	33 & 34 Vict. c. 64	9 August 1870
An Act to amend the Petty Sessions Clerk (Ireland) Act, 1858. (Repealed by Summary Jurisdiction and Criminal Justice Act (Northern Ireland) 1935 (25 & 26 Geo. 5. c. 13 (N.I.)))
Larceny (Advertisements) Act 1870 (repealed)	33 & 34 Vict. c. 65	9 August 1870
An Act to amend the Law relating to Advertisements respecting Stolen Goods. (Repealed for England and Wales and Scotland by Theft Act 1968 (c. 60) and for Northern Ireland by Theft Act (Northern Ireland) 1969 (c. 16 (N.I.)))
British Columbia Government Act 1870 (repealed)	33 & 34 Vict. c. 66	9 August 1870
An Act to make further provision for the Government of British Columbia. (Repealed by Statute Law Revision Act 1894 (57 & 58 Vict. c. 56))
Reserve Forces Act 1870 or the Army Enlistment Act 1870 or the Army Enlistment (Short Service) Act 1870 (repealed)	33 & 34 Vict. c. 67	9 August 1870
An Act to shorten the time of Active Service in the Army, and to amend in certain respects the Law of Enlistment. (Repealed by Territorial Army and Militia Act 1921 (11 & 12 Geo. 5. c. 37) and Statute Law (Repeals) Act 1993 (c. 50))
Militia Act 1870 (repealed)	33 & 34 Vict. c. 68	9 August 1870
An Act to amend the Acts relating to the Militia of the United Kingdom. (Repealed by Militia (Voluntary Enlistment) Act 1875 (38 & 39 Vict. c. 69))
Statute Law Revision Act 1870 (repealed)	33 & 34 Vict. c. 69	9 August 1870
An Act for further promoting the revision of the Statute Law by repealing certain enactments that have ceased to be in force or are consolidated by certain Acts of the present Session. (Repealed by Statute Law (Repeals) Act 1986 (c. 12))
Gas and Water Works Facilities Act 1870 (repealed)	33 & 34 Vict. c. 70	9 August 1870
An Act to facilitate in certain cases the obtaining of powers for the construction of Gas and Water Works and for the supply of Gas and Water. (Repealed for England and Wales and Scotland by Water Act 1945 (8 & 9 Geo. 6. c. 42), Water (Scotland) Act 1946 (9 & 10 Geo. 6. c. 42) and Gas Act 1948 (11 & 12 Geo. 6. c. 67) and for Northern Ireland by Gas Act (Northern Ireland) 1971 (c. 19 (N.I.)) and Water and Sewerage Services (Northern Ireland) Order 1973 (SI 1973/70 (N.I. 2)))
National Debt Act 1870	33 & 34 Vict. c. 71	9 August 1870
An Act for consolidating, with Amendments, certain Enactments relating to the National Debt.
Pedlars Act 1870 (repealed)	33 & 34 Vict. c. 72	9 August 1870
An Act for granting certificates to Pedlars. (Repealed by Pedlars Act 1871 (34 & 35 Vict. c. 96))
Annual Turnpike Acts Continuance Act 1870 (repealed)	33 & 34 Vict. c. 73	9 August 1870
An Act to continue certain Turnpike Acts in Great Britain, to repeal certain other Turnpike Acts, and to make further Provisions concerning Turnpike Roads. (Repealed by Highways Act 1959 (7 & 8 Eliz. 2. c. 25) and London Government Act 1963 (c. 33))
Curragh of Kildare Act 1870	33 & 34 Vict. c. 74	9 August 1870
An Act to confirm the Award under "The Curragh of Kildare Act, 1868." (Note: Curragh of Kildare Act 1868 (31 & 32 Vict. c. 60)) and for other purposes relating thereto.
Elementary Education Act 1870 or Forster's Education Act (repealed)	33 & 34 Vict. c. 75	9 August 1870
An Act to provide for public Elementary Education in England and Wales. (Repealed by Elementary Education Act 1873 (36 & 37 Vict. c. 86), Elementary Education Act 1876 (39 & 40 Vict. c. 79), Elementary Education Act 1891 (54 & 55 Vict. c. 56), Statute Law Revision (No. 2) Act 1893 (56 & 57 Vict. c. 54), Education Act 1902 (2 Edw. 7. c. 42), Education (London) Act 1903 (3 Edw. 7. c. 24), Children Act 1908 (8 Edw. 7. c. 67), Education Act 1918 (8 & 9 Geo. 5. c. 39), Education Act 1921 (11 & 12 Geo. 5. c. 51), Education Act 1944 (7 & 8 Geo. 6. c. 31) and Charities Act 1960 (8 & 9 Eliz. 2. c. 58))
Absconding Debtors Act 1870 (repealed)	33 & 34 Vict. c. 76	9 August 1870
An Act to facilitate the Arrest of Absconding Debtors. (Repealed by Bankruptcy Act 1883 (46 & 47 Vict. c. 52))
Juries Act 1870 (repealed)	33 & 34 Vict. c. 77	9 August 1870
An Act to amend the Laws relating to the qualifications, summoning, attendance, and remuneration of Special and Common Juries. (Repealed by Juries Act 1974 (c. 23))
Tramways Act 1870	33 & 34 Vict. c. 78	9 August 1870
An Act to facilitate the construction and to regulate the working of Tramways.
Post Office Act 1870 (repealed)	33 & 34 Vict. c. 79	9 August 1870
An Act for further regulation of Duties of Postage, and for other purposes relating to the Post Office. (Repealed by Post Office Act 1908 (8 Edw. 7. c. 48))
Census (Ireland) Act 1870 (repealed)	33 & 34 Vict. c. 80	9 August 1870
An Act for taking the Census of Ireland. (Repealed by Statute Law Revision Act 1883 (46 & 47 Vict. c. 39))
Meeting of Parliament Act 1870	33 & 34 Vict. c. 81	9 August 1870
An Act to amend the Acts of the thirty-seventh year of King George the Third, chapter one hundred and twenty-seven, (Note: Meeting of Parliament Act 1797 (37 Geo. 3. c. 127)) and the thirty-ninth and fortieth years of King George the Third, chapter fourteen. (Note: Meeting of Parliament Act 1799 (39 & 40 Geo. 3. c. 14))
Canada Defences Loan Act 1870 (repealed)	33 & 34 Vict. c. 82	9 August 1870
An Act to authorise the Commissioners of Her Majesty's Treasury to guarantee the payment of a loan to be raised by the Government of Canada for the construction of fortifications in that country. (Repealed by Canada (Public Works) Loan Act 1873 (36 & 37 Vict. c. 45))
Constabulary (Ireland) Amendment Act 1870 (repealed)	33 & 34 Vict. c. 83	9 August 1870
An Act to make better provision for the Police Force in the City of Londonderry, and to amend the Acts relating to the Royal Irish Constabulary Force. (Repealed for the Republic of Ireland by Gárda Síochána Act 1924 (No. 25 (I)) and for Northern Ireland by Statute Law Revision Act (Northern Ireland) 1954 (c. 35 (N.I.)))
Public Schools Act 1870 (repealed)	33 & 34 Vict. c. 84	9 August 1870
An Act to amend the Public Schools Act, 1868. (Note: Public Schools Act 1868 (31 & 32 Vict. c. 118)) (Repealed by Statute Law Revision Act 1883 (46 & 47 Vict. c. 39))
Norfolk Boundary Act 1870 (repealed)	33 & 34 Vict. c. 85	9 August 1870
An Act to declare the Hundred in which a Piece of Land in the County of Norfolk is situate, and to provide for the Assessment of the said Piece of Land to the County Rate. (Repealed by Statute Law Revision Act 1950 (14 Geo. 6. c. 6))
Sheriff Courts (Scotland) Act 1870 (repealed)	33 & 34 Vict. c. 86	9 August 1870
An Act to amend and extend the Act sixteenth and seventeenth Victoria, chapter ninety-two, (Note: Sheriffs (Scotland) Act 1853 (16 & 17 Vict. c. 92)) to make further provision for uniting counties in Scotland in so far as regards the jurisdiction of the Sheriff; and also to make certain provisions regarding the duties of Sheriffs and Sheriffs Substitute in Scotland. (Repealed by Sheriffdoms Reorganisation Order 1974 (SI 1974/2087))
Annuity Tax in Edinburgh and Montrose, etc. Act 1870	33 & 34 Vict. c. 87	9 August 1870
An Act to amend the Act twenty-third and twenty-fourth Victoria, chapter fifty, intituled "An Act to abolish the Annuity Tax in Edinburgh and Montrose, and to make provision in regard to the Stipends of the Ministers in that City and Burgh, and also to make provision for the Patronage of the Church of North Leith;" (Note: Annuity Tax Abolition Act 1860 (23 & 24 Vict. c. 50)) and to make provision for the abolition of the Annuity Tax within the Parish of Canongate, and for the payment of the Minister of said Parish.
Telegraph Act 1870 or the Telegraph Acts Extension Act 1870	33 & 34 Vict. c. 88	9 August 1870
An Act to extend the Telegraph Acts of 1868, (Note: Telegraph Act 1868 (31 & 32 Vict. c. 110)) 1869 (Note: Telegraph Act 1869 (32 & 33 Vict. c. 73)) to the Channel Islands and the Isle of Man.
Queen Anne's Bounty (Superannuation) Act 1870 (repealed)	33 & 34 Vict. c. 89	9 August 1870
An Act to enable the Governors of Queen Anne's Bounty to provide Superannuation Allowances for their Officers. (Repealed by Statute Law (Repeals) Act 1971 (c. 52))
Foreign Enlistment Act 1870	33 & 34 Vict. c. 90	9 August 1870
An Act to regulate the conduct of Her Majesty's Subjects during the existence of hostilities between foreign states with which Her Majesty is at peace.
Clerical Disabilities Act 1870	33 & 34 Vict. c. 91	9 August 1870
An Act for the Relief of Persons admitted to the Office of Priest or Deacon in the Church of England.
Municipal Elections Amendment (Scotland) Act 1870 (repealed)	33 & 34 Vict. c. 92	9 August 1870
An Act to amend the laws for the Election of the Magistrates and Councillors of Royal and Parliamentary Burghs in Scotland. (Repealed by Town Councils (Scotland) Act 1900 (63 & 64 Vict. c. 49))
Married Women's Property Act 1870 (repealed)	33 & 34 Vict. c. 93	9 August 1870
An Act to amend the law relating to the property of married women. (Repealed by Married Women's Property Act 1882 (45 & 46 Vict. c. 75))
Medical Officers Superannuation Act 1870 (repealed)	33 & 34 Vict. c. 94	9 August 1870
An Act to provide for Superannuation Allowances to Medical Officers of Unions, Districts, and Parishes in England and Wales. (Repealed by Poor Law Officers' Superannuation Act 1896 (59 & 60 Vict. c. 50))
Passengers Act Amendment Act 1870 (repealed)	33 & 34 Vict. c. 95	9 August 1870
An Act to authorise the carriage of Naval and Military Stores in Passenger Ships. (Repealed by Merchant Shipping Act 1894 (57 & 58 Vict. c. 60))
Appropriation Act 1870 (repealed)	33 & 34 Vict. c. 96	10 August 1870
An Act to apply a sum out of the Consolidated Fund to the service of the year ending the thirty-first day of March one thousand eight hundred and seventy-one, and to appropriate the Supplies granted in this Session of Parliament. (Repealed by Statute Law Revision Act 1966 (c. 5))
Stamp Act 1870 (repealed)	33 & 34 Vict. c. 97	10 August 1870
An Act for granting certain Stamp Duties in lieu of Duties of the same kind now payable under various Acts, and consolidating and amending provisions relating thereto. (Repealed by Stamp Duties Management Act 1891 (54 & 55 Vict. c. 38) and Stamp Act 1891 (54 & 55 Vict. c. 39))
Stamp Duties Management Act 1870 (repealed)	33 & 34 Vict. c. 98	10 August 1870
An Act for consolidating and amending the Law relating to the Management of Stamp Duties. (Repealed by Stamp Duties Management Act 1891 (54 & 55 Vict. c. 38))
Inland Revenue Repeal Act 1870 (repealed)	33 & 34 Vict. c. 99	10 August 1870
An Act for the repeal of certain Enactments relating to the Inland Revenue. (Repealed by Statute Law Revision Act 1950 (14 Geo. 6. c. 6))
Greenwich Hospital Act 1870 (repealed)	33 & 34 Vict. c. 100	10 August 1870
An Act to amend the Law relating to the repayment to the Consolidated Fund of money expended for the benefit of Greenwich Hospital. (Repealed by Greenwich Hospital Act 1885 (48 & 49 Vict. c. 42))
Pensions Commutation Act 1870 (repealed)	33 & 34 Vict. c. 101	10 August 1870
An Act for amending the Sixth Section of the Pensions Commutation Act, 1869. (Note: Pensions Commutation Act 1869 (32 & 33 Vict. c. 32)) (Repealed by Pensions Commutation Act 1871 (34 & 35 Vict. c. 36))
Naturalization Oath Act 1870 (repealed)	33 & 34 Vict. c. 102	10 August 1870
An Act to amend the Law relating to the taking of Oaths of Allegiance on Naturalization. (Repealed by British Nationality and Status of Aliens Act 1914 (4 & 5 Geo. 5. c. 17))
Expiring Laws Continuance Act 1870 (repealed)	33 & 34 Vict. c. 103	10 August 1870
An Act to continue various expiring Laws. (Repealed by Statute Law Revision Act 1883 (46 & 47 Vict. c. 39))
Joint Stock Companies Arrangement Act 1870 or the Joint Stock Companies Arrangements Act 1870 (repealed)	33 & 34 Vict. c. 104	10 August 1870
An Act to Facilitate compromises and arrangements between creditors and shareholders of Joint Stock and other Companies in liquidation. (Repealed by Companies (Consolidation) Act 1908 (8 Edw. 7. c. 69))
Truck Commission Act 1870 (repealed)	33 & 34 Vict. c. 105	10 August 1870
An Act for appointing a Commission to inquire into the alleged prevalence of the Truck System, and the disregard of the Acts of Parliament prohibiting such system, and for giving such Commission the powers necessary for Conducting such Inquiry. (Repealed by Statute Law Revision Act 1883 (46 & 47 Vict. c. 39))
Sanitary Act (Dublin) Amendment Act 1870 (repealed)	33 & 34 Vict. c. 106	10 August 1870
An Act to amend the Sanitary Act, 1866, (Note: Sanitary Act 1866 (29 & 30 Vict. c. 90)) so far as relates to the City of Dublin. (Repealed by Statute Law Revision Act 1894 (57 & 58 Vict. c. 56))
Census (England) Act 1870 (repealed)	33 & 34 Vict. c. 107	10 August 1870
An Act for taking the Census of England. (Repealed by Statute Law Revision Act 1883 (46 & 47 Vict. c. 39))
Census (Scotland) Act 1870 (repealed)	33 & 34 Vict. c. 108	10 August 1870
An Act for taking the Census in Scotland. (Repealed by Statute Law Revision Act 1883 (46 & 47 Vict. c. 39) (Note: Incorrectly cited as "SL(R) 1989" in the Chronological Table of the Statutes.))
Common Law Procedure Amendment Act (Ireland) 1870 (repealed)	33 & 34 Vict. c. 109	10 August 1870
An Act to abolish certain Real Actions in the Superior Courts of Common Law in Ireland, and further to amend the Procedure in the said Courts; and for other purposes. (Repealed by Statute Law Revision (No. 2) Act 1893 (56 & 57 Vict. c. 54) and Northern Ireland (Remittal and Removal of Proceedings) Order 1971 (SI 1971/875))
Matrimonial Causes and Marriage Law (Ireland) Amendment Act 1870	33 & 34 Vict. c. 110	10 August 1870
An Act to provide for the administration of the Law relating to Matrimonial Causes and Matters, and to amend to Law relating to Marriages, in Ireland.
Beerhouse Act 1870 (repealed)	33 & 34 Vict. c. 111	10 August 1870
An Act to make provision in relation to certain Beerhouses not duly qualified according to Law. (Repealed by Licensing (Consolidation) Act 1910 (10 Edw. 7 & 1 Geo. 5. c. 24))
Glebe Loan (Ireland) Act 1870 (repealed)	33 & 34 Vict. c. 112	10 August 1870
An Act to amend the Act of the first and second years of the reign of His late Majesty King William the Fourth, chapter thirty-three, (Note: Public Works (Ireland) Act 1831 (1 & 2 Will. 4. c. 33)) in part, and to afford facilities for obtaining Loans for the erection, enlargement, and improvement of Glebe Houses, and for the acquirement of lands for Glebes, in Ireland. (Repealed by Glebe Loan (Ireland) Amendment Act 1871 (34 & 35 Vict. c. 100), Statute Law Revision Act 1883 (46 & 47 Vict. c. 39) and Statute Law Revision Act (Northern Ireland) 1954 (c. 35 (N.I.)))

=== Local acts ===
Short title	Citation	Royal assent
Long title
Chester Gas Act 1870	33 & 34 Vict. c. i	12 May 1870
An Act to authorise the Chester United Gas Company to raise additional Capital.
Mansfield Water Act 1870	33 & 34 Vict. c. ii	12 May 1870
An Act for supplying the town and parish of Mansfield in the county of Nottingham with Water.
Runcorn, Weston and Halton Waterworks (Capital) Act 1870	33 & 34 Vict. c. iii	12 May 1870
An Act to enable the Runcorn, Weston, and Halton Waterworks Company to raise additional Capital.
Leicester Lunatic Asylum Act 1870 (repealed)	33 & 34 Vict. c. iv	12 May 1870
An Act for extending the powers of "The Leicester Lunatic Asylum and Improvement Act, 1865," (Note: Leicester Lunatic Asylum and Improvement Act 1865 (28 & 29 Vict. c. vii)) and for other purposes. (Repealed by Leicester Corporation Act 1956 (4 & 5 Eliz. 2. c. xlix))
Newport (Isle of Wight) Gas Act 1870 (repealed)	33 & 34 Vict. c. v	12 May 1870
An Act for better supplying with Gas the borough of Newport and the parishes of Carisbrooke, Whippingham, and St. Nicholas in the Isle of Wight in the county of Southampton; and for other purposes. (Repealed by Newport (Isle of Wight) Corporation Act 1946 (9 & 10 Geo. 6. c. xxi))
Oyster and Mussel Fisheries Supplemental Act 1870 (No. 1) or the Oyster and Mussel Fisheries Supplemental Act 1870	33 & 34 Vict. c. vi	12 May 1870
An Act to confirm certain Orders made by the Board of Trade under The Sea Fisheries Act, 1868, (Note: Sea Fisheries Act 1868 (31 & 32 Vict. c. 45)) relating to Boston Deeps and Emsworth.
	Boston Deeps Fishery Order 1870 Order for the Regulation, by the Corporation of the Borough of Boston, of an Oyster and Mussel Fishery in Boston Deeps, being a portion of the Estuary called the Wash, in the County of Lincoln.	
	Emsworth Fishery Order 1870 Order for the Establishment and Maintenance by the Oyster Merchants' Company, Limited, of a Several Oyster and Mussel Fishery at Emsworth, in the Estuary of the Emsworth Channel, in the Counties of Sussex and Southampton.	
North-eastern Railway Company's (Consolidation of Stocks) Act 1870 or the North Eastern Railway (Consolidation of Stocks) Act 1870	33 & 34 Vict. c. vii	12 May 1870
An Act to consolidate into one ordinary Stock the separate ordinary Stocks and Shares in the North-eastern Railway Company, and to make other provisions consequent thereon, and in reference to the Share Capital of the Company; and for other purposes.
Abbot's Wood (Dean Forest) Act 1870	33 & 34 Vict. c. viii	12 May 1870
An Act to ascertain and commute Commonable and certain other Bights in the Abbot's Wood in the Forest of Dean in Gloucestershire.
Callander and Oban Railway (Abandonment, &c.) Act 1870	33 & 34 Vict. c. ix	12 May 1870
An Act to authorise the abandonment of a portion of the Callander and Oban Railway, to extend the time for the completion of another portion thereof; and for other purposes.
Airedale Gas Act 1870	33 & 34 Vict. c. x	12 May 1870
An Act for incorporating "The Airedale Gas Company," and for enabling them to supply Gas to parts of the townships of Idle and Eccleshill, in the West Riding of Yorkshire.
King's Lynn Gas Act 1870	33 & 34 Vict. c. xi	12 May 1870
An Act for incorporating "the Kings Lynn Gas Company," and for enabling them to supply Gas to Kings Lynn and other places in Norfolk.
Wrexham Gas Act 1870	33 & 34 Vict. c. xii	12 May 1870
An Act for incorporating the Wrexham Gaslight Company, with powers to supply the town of Wrexham and its neighbourhood with Gas; and for other purposes.
Chesterfield and Brampton Railway Act 1870	33 & 34 Vict. c. xiii	12 May 1870
An Act to authorise the construction of a Railway from the Midland Railway at Chesterfield to Brampton, and Branch Railways or Tramways connected therewith, in the county of Derby; and for other purposes.
Broughty Ferry Commissioners Gas Act 1870	33 & 34 Vict. c. xiv	12 May 1870
An Act to enable the Commissioners of Police of the Burgh of Broughty Ferry to purchase the Gasworks of the Broughty Ferry Gaslight Company, and to supply gas within the said Burgh and District.
Female Orphan Asylum Amendment Act 1870 (repealed)	33 & 34 Vict. c. xv	12 May 1870
An Act to amend the Acts relating to the Asylum for Female Orphans. (Repealed by Statute Law (Repeals) Act 2013 (c. 2))
Severn and Wye Railway and Canal Act 1870	33 & 34 Vict. c. xvi	12 May 1870
An Act to enable the Severn and Wye Railway and Canal Company to extend their railway to the Ross and Monmouth Railway near the River Wye.
Hyde Local Board (Waterworks) Act 1870	33 & 34 Vict. c. xvii	12 May 1870
An Act to enable the local board for the district of Hyde, in the county palatine of Chester, to purchase the Hyde, Werneth, and Newton Waterworks, and to confer upon them other powers with reference thereto.
Beccles Waterworks Act 1870 (repealed)	33 & 34 Vict. c. xviii	12 May 1870
An Act for better supplying with Water the town and parish of Beccles, in the county of Suffolk. (Repealed by Beccles Water Order 1950 (SI 1950/257))
Fylde Waterworks Act 1870	33 & 34 Vict. c. xix	12 May 1870
An Act to amend The Fylde Waterworks Act, 1861, (Note: Fylde Waterworks Act 1861 (24 & 25 Vict. c. cliv)) to increase the capital of the Fylde Waterworks Company, to extend and define the limits of supply, to give power to alter the number of directors; and for other purposes.
Millwall Dock Act 1870 (repealed)	33 & 34 Vict. c. xx	12 May 1870
An Act to amend and extend the Acts relating to the Millwall Canal Company, to change the name of the Company; and for other purposes. (Repealed by Port of London (Consolidation) Act 1920 (10 & 11 Geo. 5. c. clxxiii))
North British and Mercantile Insurance Company's Act 1870 (repealed)	33 & 34 Vict. c. xxi	12 May 1870
An Act to alter and enlarge some of the powers of "The North British and Mercantile Insurance Company." (Repealed by North British and Mercantile Insurance Company's Act 1920 (10 & 11 Geo. 5. c. cxxxii))
Shoreham and District Waterworks Act 1870 (repealed)	33 & 34 Vict. c. xxii	12 May 1870
An Act for better supplying with Water the parishes of Old Shoreham, New Shoreham, Kingston-by-Sea, Southwick, Portslade, and Aldrington, in the county of Sussex. (Repealed by Brighton Corporation Act 1931 (21 & 22 Geo. 5. c. cix))
Southport Waterworks Act 1870 (repealed)	33 & 34 Vict. c. xxiii	12 May 1870
An Act to amend and enlarge the Provisions of "The Southport Waterworks Act, 1854," (Note: Southport Waterworks Act 1854 (17 & 18 Vict. c. xvi)) "The Southport Waterworks Act, 1856," (Note: Southport Waterworks Act 1856 (19 & 20 Vict. c. viii)) and "The Southport Waterworks Act, 1867," (Note: Southport Waterworks Act 1867 (30 & 31 Vict. c. cx)) to make further and better Provision for supplying the town of Southport and the adjoining districts with Water; and for other purposes. (Repealed by Southport Water (Transfer) Act 1901 (1 Edw. 7. c. ccxlviii))
Yeadon Waterworks Act 1870 (repealed)	33 & 34 Vict. c. xxiv	12 May 1870
An Act for dissolving the Yeadon Waterworks Company limited, and re-incorporating the Proprietors therein with others for more effectually supplying with Water the Township of Yeadon, and certain parts of the Township of Bawden, both in the Parish of Guiseley, in the West Riding of the County of York; and for other purposes. (Repealed by Rombalds Water Board Order 1962 (SI 1962/271))
Chiltern Hills Spring Water Act 1870	33 & 34 Vict. c. xxv	12 May 1870
An Act to incorporate the Proprietors of the Chiltern Hills Spring Water Company (Limited), and granting them powers with reference to Supply of Water to the town of Aylesbury and the vicinity thereof; and other purposes.
Brecon Gas Act 1870	33 & 34 Vict. c. xxvi	12 May 1870
An Act to incorporate the Brecon Gas Company, and to enable them to supply the town of Brecon with gas; and for other purposes relating to the Company.
Oyster and Mussel Fisheries Orders Confirmation Act 1870 (No. 2) (repealed)	33 & 34 Vict. c. xxvii	20 June 1870
An Act to confirm certain Orders made by the Board of Trade under The Sea Fisheries Act, 1868, relating to the Frith of Forth. (Repealed by Statute Law (Repeals) Act 1998 (c. 43))
	Aberdour (Fife) Fishery Order 1870 Order for the Establishment and Maintenance by the Right Honourable Sholto John Watson Douglas, Earl of Morton, of a several or exclusive Mussel Fishery in the Frith of Forth in the County of Fife.	
	Buccleuch Fishery Order 1870 Order for the Establishment and Maintenance, by his Grace Walter Francis Duke of Buccleuch and Queensbury, of a several or exclusive Mussel Fishery in the Frith of Forth in the County of Edinburgh.	
	Mid-Forth Fishery Order 1870 Order for the Establishment and Maintenance by John Anderson, of No. 106, George Street, Edinburgh, Merchant, of a several or exclusive Oyster and Mussel Fishery in the Frith of Forth in the County of Fife.	
Wolverhampton and Walsall Railway Act 1870	33 & 34 Vict. c. xxviii	20 June 1870
An Act to confer further powers on the Wolverhampton and Walsall Railway Company.
Newport Pagnell Railway (Extension of Time and Finance) Act 1870	33 & 34 Vict. c. xxix	20 June 1870
An Act to grant further powers to the Newport Pagnell Railway Company.
Eccleshill and Bolton Gas Act 1870 (repealed)	33 & 34 Vict. c. xxx	20 June 1870
An Act to incorporate the Eccleshill and Bolton Gas Company, Limited, and to make further provision for lighting certain parts of the townships of Eccleshill and Bolton with Gas; and for other purposes. (Repealed by West Yorkshire Act 1980 (c. xiv))
Duke of Sutherland's Railway Act 1870	33 & 34 Vict. c. xxxi	20 June 1870
An Act for the making of a Railway from Golspie to Helmsdale in the county of Sutherland, and for the abandonment of part of the authorised railway of the Sutherland Railway Company; and for other purposes.
Gunthorpe Bridge Act 1870 (repealed)	33 & 34 Vict. c. xxxii	20 June 1870
An Act to authorise the construction of a Bridge over the river Trent in the county of Nottingham, and Roads and Approaches thereto, to be called "the Gunthorpe Bridge." (Repealed by Nottinghamshire County Council (Gunthorpe Bridge) Act 1925 (15 & 16 Geo. 5. c. lvii))
Torbay and Dartmouth Shipping Dues Act 1870	33 & 34 Vict. c. xxxiii	20 June 1870
An Act to constitute a body of Commissioners, and to empower them to purchase certain shipping dues from His Royal Highness the Prince of Wales; and also to provide for the alteration and ultimate extinction of such shipping dues, and for raising moneys; and for other purposes.
Fosdyke Bridge Transfer Act 1870	33 & 34 Vict. c. xxxiv	20 June 1870
An Act to vest Fosdyke Bridge and certain property connected therewith in the inhabitants of the parts of Holland in Lincolnshire as a county bridge and county property.
Paisley Corporation Gas Act 1870	33 & 34 Vict. c. xxxv	20 June 1870
An Act for vesting in the Corporation of Paisley the supply of Gas to that town and the suburbs thereof; and for other purposes.
Great Eastern Railway (General Powers) Act 1870	33 & 34 Vict. c. xxxvi	20 June 1870
An Act to confer various powers upon the Great Eastern Railway Company with respect to the Ramsey Branch of the said Company, and the Tendring Hundred Railway; and for other purposes.
Royal Bank of Scotland Officers' Widows' Fund Act 1870 (repealed)	33 & 34 Vict. c. xxxvii	20 June 1870
An Act for better raising and securing a Fund for the Widows and Children of the Officers^ Agents, Clerks, and Porters of the Royal Bank of Scotland. (Repealed by Royal Bank of Scotland Officers' Widows' Fund Order Confirmation Act 1949 (12, 13 & 14 Geo. 6. c. xiii))
St. Alban's Gas Act 1870	33 & 34 Vict. c. xxxviii	20 June 1870
An Act for dissolving the Saint Alban's Gas and Water Company, and re-incorporating the proprietors therein with others for more effectually supplying with Gas the borough of Saint Alban and other adjoining parishes and places; and for other purposes.
North Metropolitan Railway (Extension of Time) Act 1870	33 & 34 Vict. c. xxxix	20 June 1870
An Act to extend the Time for the compulsory Purchase of Lauds for the purposes of the North Metropolitan Railway Act, 1867. (Note: North Metropolitan Railway Act 1867 (30 & 31 Vict. c. lxxxvi))
Hebden Bridge Gas Act 1870	33 & 34 Vict. c. xl	20 June 1870
An Act for incorporating and granting further powers to the Hebden Bridge Gas Company.
Penicuik Railway Act 1870	33 & 34 Vict. c. xli	20 June 1870
An Act for making a Railway from the Hawthornden station of the Peebles Railway to Penicuik in the county of Edinburgh; and for other purposes.
Glasgow Juvenile Delinquency Repression Acts Amendment Act 1870 (repealed)	33 & 34 Vict. c. xlii	20 June 1870
An Act to amend two Acts (Note: Glasgow Juvenile Delinquency Act 1841 (4 & 5 Vict. c. xxxvi)) (Note: Glasgow Juvenile Delinquency Repression Act 1866 (29 & 30 Vict. c. lxvi)) for Repressing Juvenile Delinquency in the City of Glasgow. (Repealed by Glasgow Juvenile Delinquency Prevention and Repression Act 1878 (41 & 42 Vict. c. cxxi))
Aberdare Local Board Waterworks Act 1870	33 & 34 Vict. c. xliii	20 June 1870
An Act to enable the Local Board for the District of Aberdare to erect Waterworks and supply Water; to purchase the Undertaking of the Aberdare Waterworks Company; and for other purposes.
Caledonian Railway (Additional Powers) Act 1870	33 & 34 Vict. c. xliv	20 June 1870
An Act for conferring various additional powers upon the Caledonian Railway Company; and for other purposes.
Northampton Corporation Markets and Fairs Act 1870 (repealed)	33 & 34 Vict. c. xlv	20 June 1870
An Act to empower the corporation of Northampton to establish Markets and Fairs; and for other purposes. (Repealed by Northampton Act 1988 (c. xxix))
Edinburgh, Loanhead and Roslin Railway Act 1870	33 & 34 Vict. c. xlvi	20 June 1870
An Act to authorise the Construction of the Edinburgh, Loanhead, and Roslin Railway.
Metropolitan and St. John's Wood Railway (Further Powers) Act 1870	33 & 34 Vict. c. xlvii	20 June 1870
An Act to enable the Metropolitan and Saint John's Wood Railway Company to abandon the authorised Extension of their Railway to Hampstead; and for other purposes.
Edinburgh Royal Infirmary Act 1870	33 & 34 Vict. c. xlviii	20 June 1870
An Act for authorising the Corporation of the Royal Infirmary of Edinburgh to remove their infirmary buildings to a more suitable position, and to acquire for that purpose the site of George Watson's Hospital and adjacent lands; and for other purposes.
Milford Haven Dock and Railway Act 1870	33 & 34 Vict. c. xlix	20 June 1870
An Act to extend the time for completing the works of the Milford Haven Dock and Railway Company; to lease the undertaking; and for other purposes.
Bedford and Northampton Railway Act 1870	33 & 34 Vict. c. l	20 June 1870
An Act for extending the time for the completion of the Bedford and Northampton Railway.
Reading Gas Act 1870	33 & 34 Vict. c. li	20 June 1870
An Act for enabling the Reading Gas Company to raise additional Capital; to construct new Works; for extending their Limits of Supply; and for other purposes.
Great Eastern Railway (Metropolitan Railways) Act 1870	33 & 34 Vict. c. lii	20 June 1870
An Act for making alterations in the authorised Metropolitan Railways of the Great Eastern Railway Company, and for extending the time for the completion thereof; and for conferring upon that Company and upon certain other companies other powers in connexion with the said railways; and for other purposes.
Bath Act 1870	33 & 34 Vict. c. liii	20 June 1870
An Act for empowering the Mayor, Aldermen, and Burgesses of the city and borough of Bath to more effectually supply with Water the city and borough of Bath; and for other purposes.
Clyde Navigation (Stobcross Dock) Act 1870	33 & 34 Vict. c. liv	20 June 1870
An Act to authorise the Trustees of the Clyde Navigation to construct a Dock or Tidal Basin, Quays, Tramways, and other works at the Harbour of Glasgow; to abandon certain works, and to borrow additional money; and for other purposes.
East London Railway (Further Powers) Act 1870	33 & 34 Vict. c. lv	20 June 1870
An Act to enlarge the powers of the East London Railway Company for the compulsory purchase of lands and for the completion of works, and to enable them to raise further money; to confirm and authorise agreements between the East London and other Railway Companies; and for other purposes.
Leeds Corporation Gas Act 1870 (repealed)	33 & 34 Vict. c. lvi	20 June 1870
An Act for the transfer to the mayor, aldermen, and burgesses of the borough of Leeds of the undertakings of the Leeds Gaslight Company and the Leeds New Gas Company; and for other purposes. (Repealed by West Yorkshire Act 1980 (c. xiv))
Ruabon Water Act 1870	33 & 34 Vict. c. lvii	20 June 1870
An Act for better supplying with Water the town of Ruabon and places adjacent, in the county of Denbigh.
Limerick and Ennis Railway Act 1870	33 & 34 Vict. c. lviii	20 June 1870
An Act to authorise the Limerick and Ennis Railway Company to cancel certain authorised but unissued Shares, and to borrow on Mortgage in lieu thereof, and to issue Debenture Stock; and for other purposes.
Limerick and Foynes Railway Act 1870	33 & 34 Vict. c. lix	20 June 1870
An Act to authorise the Limerick and Foynes Railway Company to cancel certain authorised but unissued preference shares, and to borrow on mortgage in lieu thereof, and to issue debenture stock; and for other purposes.
Birmingham Canal Navigations Act 1870	33 & 34 Vict. c. lx	20 June 1870
An Act to confer further powers on the Company of Proprietors of the Birmingham Canal Navigations; and for other purposes.
Gloucester and Berkeley Canal Act 1870	33 & 34 Vict. c. lxi	20 June 1870
An Act to enable the Gloucester and Berkeley Canal Company to extend and improve their works, to convert their existing capital into stock; and for other purposes.
London, Blackwall and Millwall Extension Railway Act 1870	33 & 34 Vict. c. lxii	20 June 1870
An Act to enlarge the powers of the London and Blackwall Railway Company, and to enable them to abandon certain Railways authorised by "The London, Blackwall, and Millwall Extension Railway Act, 1865." (Note: London, Blackwall and Millwall Extension Railway Act 1865 (28 & 29 Vict. c. cxvi))
Midland Railway (Additional Powers) Act 1870	33 & 34 Vict. c. lxiii	20 June 1870
An Act for conferring additional powers on the Midland Railway Company for the construction of works, and for the raising of further capital; and for other purposes.
Shipley Gas Act 1870	33 & 34 Vict. c. lxiv	20 June 1870
An Act to extend the Limits and increase the Capital of the Shipley Gaslight Company; and for other purposes.
Cawood Bridge Act 1870	33 & 34 Vict. c. lxv	20 June 1870
An Act to authorise the construction a of Bridge over the River Ouse in the county of York, to be called "Cawood Bridge."
Kirkcaldy and Dysart Waterworks Amendment Act 1870 (repealed)	33 & 34 Vict. c. lxvi	20 June 1870
An Act to authorise the Waterworks Commissioners of Kirkcaldy and Dysart to raise a further sum of money, and to amend "The Kirkcaldy and Dysart Waterworks Act, 1867;" (Note: Kirkcaldy and Dysart Waterworks Act 1867 (30 & 31 Vict. c. cxxxix)) and for other purposes. (Repealed by Kirkcaldy Corporation Order Confirmation Act 1939 (2 & 3 Geo. 6. c. vi))
Stapenhill Bridge Act 1870 (repealed)	33 & 34 Vict. c. lxvii	20 June 1870
An Act to extend the time for the completion of Stapenhill Bridge at Burton-upon-Trent. (Repealed by Staffordshire Act 1983 (c. xviii))
Buxton Gas Act 1870	33 & 34 Vict. c. lxviii	20 June 1870
An Act for more effectually lighting with Gas Buxton and other places in Derbyshire.
Cleckheaton Local Board Act 1870	33 & 34 Vict. c. lxix	20 June 1870
An Act to enable the Local Board for the district of Cleckheaton to make and supply Gas, and to purchase the undertaking of the Cleckheaton Gas Company, to confer other powers in relation to gas on the said Local Board; and for other purposes.
Imperial Continental Gas Association Act 1870 (repealed)	33 & 34 Vict. c. lxx	20 June 1870
An Act for granting further powers to the Imperial Continental Gas Association. (Repealed by Imperial Continental Gas Association Act 1929 (19 & 20 Geo. 5. c. lxxxix))
Great Northern Railway Act 1870	33 & 34 Vict. c. lxxi	20 June 1870
An Act to enable the Great Northern Railway Company to abandon the construction of the Watford and Edgware Railway.
Dare Valley Railway Act 1870	33 & 34 Vict. c. lxxii	20 June 1870
An Act to authorise the Dare Valley Railway Company to raise additional capital, to abandon a portion of their authorised railway, and to lease their undertaking to the Taff Vale Railway Company; and for other purposes.
Llantrissant and Taff Vale Junction Railway Act 1870	33 & 34 Vict. c. lxxiii	20 June 1870
An Act to authorise the Llantrissant and Taff Vale Junction Railway Company to abandon the construction of a certain railway authorised by "The Llantrissant and Taff Vale Junction Railway Act, 1866;" (Note: Llantrissant and Taff Vale Junction Railway Act 1866 (29 & 30 Vict. c. ccxlviii)) and to extend the time for the completion of another railway authorised by the same Act; and to lease their undertaking to the Taff Vale Railway Company; and for other purposes.
Girvan and Portpatrick Junction Railway Act 1870	33 & 34 Vict. c. lxxiv	20 June 1870
An Act for the revival of the powers and extension of the time for the compulsory purchase of lands and completion of the railway authorised by "The Girvan and Portpatrick Junction Railway Act, 1865," (Note: Girvan and Portpatrick Junction Railway Act 1865 (28 & 29 Vict. c. ccclviii)) and also for enabling the Girvan and Portpatrick Junction Railway Company to divide and convert the shares in their capital into preferred and deferred shares; and for other purposes.
Cardiff Gaslight and Coke Company's Act 1870 (repealed)	33 & 34 Vict. c. lxxv	20 June 1870
An Act for extending the Limits within which the Cardiff Gaslight and Coke Company may supply Gas, and for empowering the Company to raise additional Capital; and for other purposes. (Repealed by South Glamorgan Act 1976 (c. xxxv))
Carmarthen Gas Act 1870	33 & 34 Vict. c. lxxvi	20 June 1870
An Act incorporating and conferring further powers on the Carmarthen Gas Company.
Rainhill Gas and Water Act 1870 (repealed)	33 & 34 Vict. c. lxxvii	20 June 1870
An Act to incorporate a Company for better supplying with Gas and Water the township of Rainhill, in the parish of Prescot and county palatine of Lancaster; and for other purposes. (Repealed by Prescot Gas Order 1929 (SR&O 1929/1099))
Blane Valley Railway Act 1870	33 & 34 Vict. c. lxxviii	20 June 1870
An Act for the abandonment of the extension authorised by "The Blane Valley Railway Extension Act, 1865;" (Note: Blane Valley Railway Extension Act 1865 (28 & 29 Vict. c. ccclvi)) and for other purposes.
Lancashire and Yorkshire and London and North-western Railway Companies (Steam Vessels) Act 1870	33 & 34 Vict. c. lxxix	20 June 1870
An Act for authorising the Lancashire and Yorkshire Railway Company and the London and North-western Railway Company to run Steam Vessels between Fleetwood and Belfast; and for other purposes.
Lancashire and Yorkshire Railway (Ripponden Branch Extension, &c.) Act 1870	33 & 34 Vict. c. lxxx	20 June 1870
An Act for conferring powers on the Lancashire and Yorkshire Railway Company for the construction of a railway and other works, and the acquisition of lands, in the west riding of the county of York and the county of Lancaster; and for other purposes.
Drainage and Improvement of Lands Supplemental (Ireland) Act 1870	33 & 34 Vict. c. lxxxi	4 July 1870
An Act to confirm a Provisional Order under "The Drainage and Improvement of Lands (Ireland) Act, 1863," (Note: Drainage and Improvement of Lands Act (Ireland) 1863 (26 & 27 Vict. c. 88)) and the Acts amending the same.
	Frankford River (County Offaly) Drainage District Order 1870 Drainage and Improvement of Lands Act (Ireland), 1863, 26th and 27th Victoria, chapter 88, 27th and 28th Victoria, chapter 72, (Note: Drainage and Improvement of Lands (Ireland) Act 1864 (27 & 28 Vict. c. 72)) and 28th and 29th Victoria, chapter 52. (Note: Drainage and Improvement of Lands Amendment Act (Ireland) 1865 (28 & 29 Vict. c. 52)); In the matter of the Frankford River drainage district in the King's County.	
Pier and Harbour Orders Confirmation (No. 1) Act 1870	33 & 34 Vict. c. lxxxii	4 July 1870
An Act for confirming certain Provisional Orders made by the Board of Trade under The General Pier and Harbour Act, 1861, (Note: General Pier and Harbour Act 1861 (24 & 25 Vict. c. 45)) relating to Alum Bay, Dartmouth, Ilfracombe, Penryn, and Walton-on-the-Naze.
	Alum Bay Pier Order 1870 Order for the regulation of a Pier at Alum Bay in the Parish of Freshwater in the Isle of Wight.	
	Dartmouth Harbour Order 1870 Order for amending the Dartmouth Harbour Order, 1863, and making further provision for the maintenance and regulation of that Harbour.	
	Ilfracombe Harbour Order 1870 Order for the improvement, maintenance, and regulation of the Harbour of Ilfracombe in the county of Devon.	
	Penryn Harbour Order 1870 Order for the maintenance and regulation of the Harbour of Penryn in the County of Cornwall.	
	Walton-on-the-Naze Pier Order 1870 Order for extending the time for completion of the Works, and for amending "The Walton-on-the-Naze Pier Order, 1864."	
Great Western Railway (Hereford and Gloucester Canal Vesting) Act 1870	33 & 34 Vict. c. lxxxiii	4 July 1870
An Act for vesting in the Great Western Railway Company the undertaking of the Company of Proprietors of the Herefordshire and Gloucestershire Canal Navigation; and for other purposes.
North Union Railway (Preston Station) Act 1870	33 & 34 Vict. c. lxxxiv	4 July 1870
An Act for enabling the London and North-western and the Lancashire and Yorkshire Railway Companies to alter and enlarge their station at Preston, and in connexion therewith to acquire lands and execute certain works, and for authorising Agreements between the Companies in reference to those and other matters; and for other purposes.
Colne Fishery Act 1870	33 & 34 Vict. c. lxxxv	4 July 1870
An Act to incorporate the Colne Fishery Company, and to authorise the demise to them of the Fishery of the River Colne.
Dublin and Antrim Junction Railway Act 1870	33 & 34 Vict. c. lxxxvi	4 July 1870
An Act to enable the Dublin and Antrim Junction Railway Company to raise further moneies by borrowing; and for other purposes.
Lincoln City Commons Act 1870	33 & 34 Vict. c. lxxxvii	4 July 1870
An Act for carrying into effect Arrangements with respect to Commons parcel of the Manor of the City of Lincoln.
Yeovil Improvement Act 1870	33 & 34 Vict. c. lxxxviii	4 July 1870
An Act to make provision for supplying the Borough of Yeovil with Water; for amending "The Borough of Yeovil Extension and Improvement Act, 1854;" (Note: Borough of Yeovil Extension and Improvement Act 1854 (17 & 18 Vict. c. cxxv)) and for other purposes.
Great Northern and Western (of Ireland) Railway (Westport Quay Line) Act 1870	33 & 34 Vict. c. lxxxix	4 July 1870
An Act to extend for a further Period the Time for the Construction of a Portion of the Railway authorised by the Great Northern and Western (of Ireland) Railway Act, 1861; (Note: Great Northern and Western (of Ireland) Railway Act 1861 (24 & 25 Vict. c. lxvii)) and for other purposes.
Tyne Improvement Act 1870 (repealed)	33 & 34 Vict. c. xc	4 July 1870
An Act to authorise the Tyne Improvement Commissioners to collect certain Coal and other Dues now collected by the Mayor, Aldermen, and Burgesses of the borough of Newcastle-upon-Tyne, and to apply the whole thereof to the Tyne Improvement Fund; and for other purposes. (Repealed by Port of Tyne Reorganisation Scheme 1967 Confirmation Order 1968 (SI 1968/942))
North British and Edinburgh and Bathgate Railways Act 1870	33 & 34 Vict. c. xci	4 July 1870
An Act to amend "The Edinburgh and Bathgate Railway Act, 1846," (Note: Edinburgh and Bathgate Railway Act 1846 (9 & 10 Vict. c. cccxxxii)) with respect to the Rents payable under the Lease thereby authorised; and for other purposes.
Thames Embankment (North) Act 1870 (repealed)	33 & 34 Vict. c. xcii	4 July 1870
An Act for the abandonment of the authorised street from the Thames Embankment below Charing Cross railway bridge to Wellington Street, Strand; and for other purposes. (Repealed by Local Law (Greater London Council and Inner London Boroughs) Order 1965 (SI 1965/540))
Leeds Corporation Gas and Improvements, &c. Act 1870	33 & 34 Vict. c. xciii	4 July 1870
An Act for making further provision with respect to the Sanitary Condition of the Borough of Leeds; and for other purposes.
Metropolitan District Railway Act 1870	33 & 34 Vict. c. xciv	4 July 1870
An Act to enable the Metropolitan District Railway Company to make a Station near Bread Street, (Note: Mansion House station, opened in 1871 as the eastern terminus of the District Railway.) and for other purposes with respect to the same Company.
Halifax Water and Gas Extension Act 1870 (repealed)	33 & 34 Vict. c. xcv	4 July 1870
An Act for amending and extending the Acts relating to the supply of Water and Gas in the borough of Halifax and its neighbourhood, and to the improvement of that borough; and for other purposes. (Repealed by West Yorkshire Act 1980 (c. xiv))
Dublin Corporation Waterworks Act 1870	33 & 34 Vict. c. xcvi	4 July 1870
An Act to enable the lord mayor, aldermen, and burgesses of Dublin to enlarge and extend portions of the Dublin Corporation Waterworks; to amend the Dublin Corporation Waterworks Acts, 1861, (Note: Dublin Corporation Waterworks Act 1861 (24 & 25 Vict. c. clxxii)) 1863, (Note: Dublin Corporation Waterworks Amendment Act 1863 (26 & 27 Vict. c. lxxviii)) and 1866; (Note: Dublin Corporation Waterworks Acts Amendment Act 1866 (29 & 30 Vict. c. xxiii)) to construct additional filter beds; to lay down additional mains or pipes; to consolidate their powers; to confirm agreements; and for other purposes.
Belfast Harbour Act 1870 (repealed)	33 & 34 Vict. c. xcvii	4 July 1870
An Act to authorise the Belfast Harbour Commissioner to sell their surplus lands, and to make leases. (Repealed by Belfast Harbour Order (Northern Ireland) 2002 (NISR 2002/40))
Sevenoaks, Maidstone and Tonbridge Railway Act 1870	33 & 34 Vict. c. xcviii	4 July 1870
An Act to enable the Sevenoaks, Maidstone, and Tunbridge Railway Company to make a deviation of their authorised railway; to extend the time for making a part of the same; and for other purposes.
Atlantic Telegraph Act 1870	33 & 34 Vict. c. xcix	4 July 1870
An Act to amalgamate the Atlantic Telegraph Company with the Anglo-American Telegraph Company, and to provide for the dissolution of the Atlantic Telegraph Company; and for other purposes.
Brighton Intercepting and Outfall Sewers Act 1870	33 & 34 Vict. c. c	4 July 1870
An Act for making Intercepting and Outfall Sewers for Brighton and certain neighbouring districts; and for other purposes.
Great Northern and Western (of Ireland) Railway (Lease) Act 1870	33 & 34 Vict. c. ci	4 July 1870
An Act to lease the Great Northern and Western (of Ireland) Railway to the Midland Great Western Railway (of Ireland) Company; and for other purposes.
Skipton Waterworks Act 1870	33 & 34 Vict. c. cii	4 July 1870
An Act for conferring additional powers upon the Company of Proprietors of the Skipton Waterworks with reference to their undertaking and the raising of money; and for other purposes.
Metropolitan Railway Act 1870	33 & 34 Vict. c. ciii	4 July 1870
An Act to extend the time for the construction by the Metropolitan Railway Company of the Tower Hill Extension.
North British Railway (General Powers) Act 1870	33 & 34 Vict. c. civ	4 July 1870
An Act to authorise Alterations in the Stobcross Railways and other works; to confer Powers upon the Trustees of the Clyde Navigation and others in reference to the Stobcross undertaking; to extend the time for the Purchase of Land and completion of various Railways; to convert Port Edgar into a Harbour; to provide for the Conversion of the Leadburn Preference Stock into Ordinary Stock, and for the Consolidation of the Lien Stocks of the North British Railway Company; and for other purposes.
North-eastern Railway Company's (Leyburn and Hawes Branch, &c.) Act 1870 or the North Eastern Railway (Leyburn and Hawes Branch, &c.) Act 1870	33 & 34 Vict. c. cv	4 July 1870
An Act for enabling the North-eastern Railway Company to construct a railway from Leyburn to Hawes, and other works, and acquire additional lands; for the abandonment of the authorised Hawes and Melmerby Railway; and for vesting in the Company the undertaking of the West Durham Railway Company; and for other purposes.
Brighton and Hove General Gas Company's Act 1870	33 & 34 Vict. c. cvi	4 July 1870
An Act for empowering the Brighton and Hove General Gas Company to construct works at or near New Shoreham Harbour, and to acquire a site for the same; and for other purposes.
Navan and King's Court Railway Act 1870	33 & 34 Vict. c. cvii	4 July 1870
An Act to extend the time for the completion of the Railway and Works of the Navan and Kings Court Railway Company, to enable that Company to enter into working and other agreements with certain Companies; and for other purposes.
Newry and Armagh Railway (Arbitration) Act 1870	33 & 34 Vict. c. cviii	4 July 1870
An Act for the arrangement by Arbitration of the Affairs of the Newry and Armagh Railway Company.
Tottenham and Hampstead Junction Railway (Abandonment) Act 1870	33 & 34 Vict. c. cix	4 July 1870
An Act for the Abandonment of the Railways authorised by "The Tottenham and Hampstead Junction Railway Act, 1866;" (Note: Tottenham and Hampstead Junction Railway Act 1866 (29 & 30 Vict. c. clxxv)) and for other purposes.
Barnstaple and Ilfracombe Railway Act 1870	33 & 34 Vict. c. cx	4 July 1870
An Act for making railways from Barnstaple to Ilfracombe; and for other purposes.
Downpatrick, Dundrum and Newcastle Railway (Lease) Act 1870	33 & 34 Vict. c. cxi	4 July 1870
An Act to enable the Downpatrick, Dundrum, and Newcastle Railway Company to grant a lease of their undertaking; and for other purposes.
London and North-western Railway (Additional Powers) Act 1870	33 & 34 Vict. c. cxii	4 July 1870
An Act for conferring additional powers on the London and North-western Railway Company in relation to their own undertaking and the undertakings of other Companies; and for other purposes.
West Hartlepool Extension and Improvement Act 1870 (repealed)	33 & 34 Vict. c. cxiii	4 July 1870
An Act for extending the limits of the district under the authority of the West Hartlepool Improvement Commissioners, and for making better provision for the improvement and government of the extended district; and for other purposes. (Repealed by County of Cleveland Act 1987 (c. ix))
Local Government Supplemental Act 1870	33 & 34 Vict. c. cxiv	14 July 1870
An Act to confirm certain Provisional Orders under "The Local Government Act, 1858," (Note: Local Government Act 1858 (21 & 22 Vict. c. 98)) relating to the districts of Blackpool, Bristol, Eton, Heckmondwike, Kidderminster, Lincoln, Nottingham, Plymouth, South Molton, Wallasey, and Ware; and for other purposes relative to certain districts under the said Act.
	Blackpool Order 1870 Provisional Order for altering the Order in Council, applying the Public Health Act, 1848, (Note: Public Health Act 1848 (11 & 12 Vict. c. 63)) to the District of Blackpool in the County of Lancaster.	
	Bristol Order 1870 Provisional Order putting in force the Lands Clauses Consolidation Act, 1845, (Note: Lands Clauses Consolidation Act 1845 (8 & 9 Vict. c. 18)) within the District of the Bristol Local Board of Health, for the Purchase of the Lands by the said Board for Street Improvements.	
	Eton Order 1870 Provisional Order empowering the Eton Local Board of Health to put in force the Lands Clauses Consolidation Act, 1845, for the Purchase of Lands by the said Board for Sewage Irrigation Purposes.	
	Eton Order (No. 2) 1870 Provisional Order for extending the Borrowing Powers of the Eton Local Board of Health.	
	Heckmondwike Order 1870 Provisional Order for altering the Order in Council, applying the Public Health Act, 1848, to the Township of Heckmondwike in the County of York.	
	Kidderminster Order 1870 Provisional Order for the repeal of the Local Act (53 Geo. 3. Cap. 83.) (Note: Kidderminster Improvement Act 1813 (53 Geo. 3. c. lxxxiii)) in force within the Borough of Kidderminster.	
	Lincoln Order 1870 Provisional Order re-enacting certain repealed Sections of the Lincoln Paving and Lighting Act (9 Geo. 4. c. 27). (Note: Lincoln Improvement Act 1828 (9 Geo. 4. c. xxvii))	
	Nottingham Order 1870 Provisional Order, putting in force the Lands Clauses Consolidation Act, 1845, within the district of the Local Board of Health for the borough of Nottingham, for the purchase and taking of lands by the said board, otherwise than by agreement.	
	Plymouth Order 1870 Provisional Order putting in force the Lands Clauses Consolidation Act, 1845, within the District of the Plymouth Local Board of Health, for the Purchase of Lands by the said Board for Street Improvements.	
	South Molton Order 1870 Provisional Order for the Alteration and partial Repeal of the South Molton Markets and Improvement Act, 1862, (Note: South Molton Markets and Improvement Act 1862 (25 & 26 Vict. c. xxvii)) in force within the District of the South Molton Local Board.	
	Wallasey Order 1870 Provisional Order repealing and altering parts of Local Acts (Note: Wallasey Improvement Act 1845 (8 & 9 Vict. c. vi)) (Note: Wallasey Improvement Act 1858 (21 & 22 Vict. c. lxiii)) (Note: Wallasey Improvement Act 1864 (27 & 28 Vict. c. cxvii)) in force within the District of the Wallasey Local Board.	
	Ware Order 1870 Provisional Order putting in force the Lands Clauses Consolidation Act, 1845, within the District of the Ware Local Board of Health, for the Purchase of Lands by the said Board for Utilization of Sewage.	
General Police and Improvement (Scotland) Supplemental Act 1870	33 & 34 Vict. c. cxv	14 July 1870
An Act to confirm Provisional Orders under "The General Police and Improvement (Scotland) Act, 1862," (Note: General Police and Improvement (Scotland) Act 1862 (25 & 26 Vict. c. 101)) relating to the Burghs of Dunfermline and Perth.
	Dunfermline Order 1870 Dunfermline. General Police and Improvement (Scotland) Act, 1862.	
	Perth Order 1870 Perth. General Police and Improvement (Scotland) Act, 1862.	
Jewish United Synagogues Act 1870	33 & 34 Vict. c. cxvi	14 July 1870
An Act for confirming a Scheme of the Charity Commissioners for the Jewish United Synagogues.
	Union of the Synagogues. Scheme.	
St. Olave, &c. Charities Act 1870 (repealed)	33 & 34 Vict. c. cxvii	14 July 1870
An Act for confirming a Scheme of the Charity Commissioners for certain charities in the parishes of Saint Olave and Saint John in the borough of Southwark. (Repealed by London Government (Borough of Bermondsey) Order in Council 1901 (SR&O 1901/264))
	In the matter of the several charities belonging jointly to the parishes of Saint Olava and Saint John in the borough of Southwark, and also of several charities belonging exclusively to the said parish of Saint John. Scheme for the Management and Regulation of the above-mentioned Charities.	
London and North-western Railway (Steam Vessels) Act 1870	33 & 34 Vict. c. cxviii	14 July 1870
An Act for conferring on the London and North-western Railway Company additional powers, and making further provision with respect to steam communication between Holyhead and Ireland; and for other purposes.
Littlehampton Water Act 1870	33 & 34 Vict. c. cxix	14 July 1870
An Act for supplying Littlehampton and certain adjacent parishes in the county of Sussex with Water.
Newcastle-upon-Tyne Improvement Act 1870 (repealed)	33 & 34 Vict. c. cxx	14 July 1870
An Act for the better management of the Town Moor of the borough of Newcastle-upon-Tyne, and for the further improvement and better government of the borough; and for other purposes. (Repealed by Newcastle-upon-Tyne Town Moor Act 1988 (c. xxxi))
Gaslight and Coke Company's Act 1870	33 & 34 Vict. c. cxxi	14 July 1870
An Act to enable the Gaslight and Coke Company to purchase the undertaking of the Victoria Docks Gas Company; and for other purposes.
Northampton and Banbury Junction Railway Act 1870	33 & 34 Vict. c. cxxii	14 July 1870
An Act for authorising an Extension of the existing railway of the Midland Counties and South Wales Railway Company to the Buckinghamshire Railway, and for reviving the powers and extending the time for purchase of lands and construction of works authorised by a former Act of the Company; and for suspending legal proceedings against the Company; and for altering the financial arrangements of the Company; and for other purposes.
Newcastle and Gateshead Waterworks Act 1870	33 & 34 Vict. c. cxxiii	14 July 1870
An Act for extending the limits within which the Newcastle and Gateshead Water Company may supply water, and for empowering them to construct additional works, and to raise additional capital; and for other purposes.
Southwark and City Subway Act 1870	33 & 34 Vict. c. cxxiv	14 July 1870
An Act to authorise the construction of a Subway under the Thames between Southwark and the City of London.
Wandsworth Bridge Act 1870 (repealed)	33 & 34 Vict. c. cxxv	14 July 1870
An Act to extend the time for the completion of the Wandsworth Bridge and Approaches; and for other purposes. (Repealed by Local Law (Greater London Council and Inner London Boroughs) Order 1965 (SI 1965/540))
Dublin, Wicklow and Wexford Railway Act 1870	33 & 34 Vict. c. cxxvi	14 July 1870
An Act to confer additional powers on the Dublin, Wicklow, and Wexford Railway Company for the construction of works and other matters relating to their undertaking; and to enable the Company and the London and North-western Railway Company to make traffic arrangements; and other purposes.
Pembroke and Tenby Railway (Dockyard Extension) Act 1870	33 & 34 Vict. c. cxxvii	14 July 1870
An Act to enable the Pembroke and Tenby Railway Company to extend their railway to Pembroke Dockyard, and to make arrangements with the Admiralty; and for other purposes.
Birmingham Waterworks Act 1870	33 & 34 Vict. c. cxxviii	14 July 1870
An Act to authorise the Company of Proprietors of the Birmingham Waterworks to extend their limits of supply, to construct further works; and for other purposes.
Salford Improvement Act 1870	33 & 34 Vict. c. cxxix	14 July 1870
An Act for amending and extending the provisions of the Acts relating to the borough of Salford; for authorising certain street improvements; and for other purposes.
Bristol and North Somerset Railway Act 1870	33 & 34 Vict. c. cxxx	14 July 1870
An Act to authorise the Bristol and North Somerset Railway Company to deviate from the authorised line of their Railway at Radstock; and for other purposes.
Ashton-under-Lyne, Stalybridge and Dukinfield (District) Waterworks Act 1870	33 & 34 Vict. c. cxxxi	14 July 1870
An Act for making better provision for the supply of Water to a district consisting of the boroughs of Ashton-under-Lyne and Stalybridge, and the district of the Dukinfield Local Board of Health, and their respective neighbourhoods; and for other purposes.
Public Health (Scotland) Supplement Act 1870	33 & 34 Vict. c. cxxxii	1 August 1870
An Act to confirm a Provisional Order under the "Public Health (Scotland) Act, 1867," (Note: Public Health (Scotland) Act 1867 (30 & 31 Vict. c. 101)) relating to the Burgh of Fraserburgh.
	Fraserburgh Order 1870 Fraserburgh. Public Health (Scotland) Act, 1867.	
Reading Local Board Waterworks, Sewerage, Drainage and Improvement Act 1870	33 & 34 Vict. c. cxxxiii	1 August 1870
An Act for enabling the Local Board of Health in and for the District of the Borough of Reading to execute certain works for the Improvement of the Water Supply and Sewerage of the Borough, and the Drainage of Lands in and adjoining thereto; and for other purposes.
Rotherham and Kimberworth Local Board of Health Act 1870 (repealed)	33 & 34 Vict. c. cxxxiv	1 August 1870
An Act to extend the time for the compulsory purchase of Lands, and completion of the Waterworks authorised by the Act (Note: Rotherham and Kimberworth Local Board of Health Act 1863 (26 & 27 Vict. c. cxvii)) relating to the Rotherham and Kimberworth Local Board of Health; and to authorise the said board to construct Gasworks, and to purchase the undertaking of the Rotherham Gaslight and Coke Company; and to authorise various agreements with respect to Water and Gas; and for other purposes. (Repealed by Statute Law (Repeals) Act 1989 (c. 43))
North British Railway (Tay Bridge and Railways) Act 1870	33 & 34 Vict. c. cxxxv	1 August 1870
An Act to authorise the North British Railway Company to make railways and a bridge across the Tay near Dundee, to connect their system with the railways of the Caledonian Railway Company east and west of Dundee; and for other purposes.
Ryde Pier Railway Extension Act 1870	33 & 34 Vict. c. cxxxvi	1 August 1870
An Act to enable the Ryde Pier Company to extend their railway to the station of the Isle of Wight Railway at Ryde; and for other purposes relating thereto.
St. Helens Gas Act 1870 (repealed)	33 & 34 Vict. c. cxxxvii	1 August 1870
An Act for granting further powers to "The Saint Helens Gas Company." (Repealed by County of Merseyside Act 1980 (c. x))
Thrapston Market Act 1870	33 & 34 Vict. c. cxxxviii	1 August 1870
An Act to incorporate a Company for establishing and holding a Market and Fairs in the town and parish of Thrapston, in the County of Northampton; and for other purposes.
Dublin Port and City Railway Act 1870	33 & 34 Vict. c. cxxxix	1 August 1870
An Act to extend the powers of the Dublin Trunk Connecting Railway Company for the taking of Lands and completion of their undertaking, to change the name of the Company; and for other purposes.
Great Western Railway Act 1870	33 & 34 Vict. c. cxl	1 August 1870
An Act for conferring further powers on the Great Western Railway Company in relation to their own undertaking and the undertakings of other Companies; and for other purposes.
Halifax and Ovenden Junction Railway Act 1870	33 & 34 Vict. c. cxli	1 August 1870
An Act to extend the time for the purchase of lands and for the construction of the Halifax and Ovenden Junction Railway, and to vest the said railway in the Lancashire and Yorkshire and the Great Northern Railway Companies.
Exmouth Docks Act 1870	33 & 34 Vict. c. cxlii	1 August 1870
An Act to amend the Exmouth Docks Act, 1864. (Note: Exmouth Docks Act 1864 (27 & 28 Vict. c. cccxix))
Enniskillen Borough Improvement Act 1870	33 & 34 Vict. c. cxliii	1 August 1870
An Act to extend and define the Limits of the Borough of Enniskillen; to enable the Commissioners for that Borough to construct Waterworks, and supply Water; and for other purposes.
Oldham Corporation Waterworks, &c. Act 1870	33 & 34 Vict. c. cxliv	1 August 1870
An Act for empowering the Corporation of Oldham to construct additional Waterworks and for extending their limits of supply of Water and Gas, and for amending The Oldham Borough Improvement Act, 1865; (Note: Oldham Borough Improvement Act 1865 (28 & 29 Vict. c. cccxi)) and for other purposes.
Worcester Railways Act 1870	33 & 34 Vict. c. cxlv	1 August 1870
An Act to authorise the Construction of Railways in the City of Worcester; and for other purposes.
Bury St. Edmunds and Thetford Railway Act 1870	33 & 34 Vict. c. cxlvi	1 August 1870
An Act to enable the Bury Saint Edmunds and Thetford Railway Company to make a Deviation in their authorised Railway; and for other purposes.
South Eastern Railway Act 1870	33 & 34 Vict. c. cxlvii	1 August 1870
An Act for empowering the South-eastern Railway Company to abandon certain authorised Lines, and for extending the time for purchase of Lands and Completion of Works of certain other Lines, and for making better provision respecting Hotels, and for amending the Company's Acts; and for other purposes.
Harborne Railway Act 1870	33 & 34 Vict. c. cxlviii	1 August 1870
An Act to extend the time for purchase of Lands, and for the completion of the Harborne Railway.
Thames Navigation Act 1870 (repealed)	33 & 34 Vict. c. cxlix	1 August 1870
An Act for extending and amending the Acts relating to the Navigation and Conservancy of the Thames; and for other purposes. (Repealed by Thames Conservancy Act 1894 (57 & 58 Vict. c. clxxxvii))
Halesowen and Bromsgrove Branch Railway Act 1870	33 & 34 Vict. c. cl	1 August 1870
An Act to extend the time and continue the powers granted to the Halesowen and Bromsgrove Branch Railways Company for the compulsory purchase of Lands, and for the completion of Railways in the County of Worcester, and to authorise that Company to abandon a certain Railway in the same county; and for other purposes.
Burnham Tidal Harbour Act 1870	33 & 34 Vict. c. cli	1 August 1870
An Act for extending the time for the completion of the authorised works of the Burnham Tidal Harbour Company.
Teign Valley Railway Act 1870	33 & 34 Vict. c. clii	1 August 1870
An Act for extending the time for the completion of the Teign Valley Railway, and for conferring additional powers upon the Teign Valley Railway Company; and for other purposes; and of which the short title is "Teign Valley Railway Act, 1870."
Newport Railway Act 1870	33 & 34 Vict. c. cliii	1 August 1870
An Act for making a Railway extending from the authorised Newport Railway to Long Craig, in the County of Fife; for abandoning the Newport Deviation Railway; and for other purposes.
London, Brighton and South Coast Railway Act 1870	33 & 34 Vict. c. cliv	1 August 1870
An Act to authorise the London, Brighton, and South Coast Railway Company to abandon the Worthing Junction and to make a short Railway for improving the communication with Eastbourne, and to acquire additional Lands, and to sanction Agreements between them and the South-eastern Railway Company; and for other purposes.
Leverington Rectory Act 1870	33 & 34 Vict. c. clv	1 August 1870
An Act for making better provision for the Cure of Souls within the limits of the Parish of Leverington, and of certain adjacent Parishes, all in the County of Cambridge and the Diocese of Ely.
Sewage Utilization Supplemental Act 1870	33 & 34 Vict. c. clvi	9 August 1870
An Act to confirm a Provisional Order under "The Sewage Utilization Acts," relating to the district of East Barnet.
	East Barnet Order 1870 Provisional Order putting in force the Lands Clauses Consolidation Act, 1845, within the Parish of East Barnet, for the Purchase of Lands by the Vestry of the said Parish for purposes of Sewage Irrigation.	
Drainage and Improvement of Lands Supplemental (Ireland) (No. 2) Act 1870	33 & 34 Vict. c. clvii	9 August 1870
An Act to confirm a Provisional Order under "The Drainage of Lands (Ireland) Act, 1865," and the Acts amending the same.
	Douglas River Drainage District Order 1870 Drainage and Improvement of Lands Act (Ireland), 1863; 26 & 27 Victoria, chapter 88; 27 & 28 Victoria, chapter 72; 28 & 29 Victoria, chapter 52; and 32 & 33 Victoria, chapter 72. (Note: Drainage and Improvement of Lands Amendment Act, Ireland 1869 (32 & 33 Vict. c. 72)); In the matter of "The Douglas River Drainage District," in the County of Carlow.	
Pier and Harbour Orders Confirmation (No. 2) Act 1870	33 & 34 Vict. c. clviii	9 August 1870
An Act for confirming certain Provisional Orders made by the Board of Trade under The General Pier and Harbour Act, 1861, relating to Falmouth, Irvine, Kinsale, Mousehole, St. Leonards-on-Sea, and Ventnor.
	Falmouth Harbour Order 1870 Order for the maintenance and regulation of the Harbour of Falmouth, in the County of Cornwall.	
	Irvine Harbour Order 1870 Order for amending "The Irvine Harbour Improvement Order, 1867."	
	Kinsale Harbour Order 1870 Order for the maintenance and regulation of the Harbour of Kinsale, in the County of Cork.	
	Mousehole Harbour Order 1870 Order for amending The Mousehole Harbour Improvement Order, 1868.	
	St. Leonards-on-Sea Pier Order 1870 Order for the Construction, Maintenance, and Regulation of a Pier at St. Leonards-on-Sea in the County of Sussex.	
	Ventnor Pier and Esplanade Order 1870 Order for the Construction, Maintenance, and Regulation of a Pier, Sea Wall, Embankment, and Esplanade, at Ventnor in the Isle of Wight.	
Pier and Harbour Orders Confirmation (No. 3) Act 1870	33 & 34 Vict. c. clix	9 August 1870
An Act for confirming a Provisional Order made by the Board of Trade under The General Pier and Harbour Act, 1861, relating to Burntisland.
	Burntisland Harbour Order 1870 Order for improving and maintaining the Harbour of Burntisland, in the county of Fife, and for constructing a Dock and other Works in connexion therewith.	
Blackburn Improvement Act 1870 (repealed)	33 & 34 Vict. c. clx	9 August 1870
An Act to enable the Corporation of Blackburn to construct Works for Sewage Utilization; to acquire Lands for that purpose; to provide a Cattle Market; to improve the Borough; and to raise further Moneys; and to confer upon the Corporation additional Powers; and for other purposes. (Repealed by County of Lancashire Act 1984 (c. xxi))
Alexandra (Newport) Dock Act 1870	33 & 34 Vict. c. clxi	9 August 1870
An Act to give further time for the completion of the Works authorised by "The Alexandra (Newport) Dock Act, 1865," (Note: Alexandra (Newport) Dock Act 1865 (28 & 29 Vict. c. ccclxxvii)) and for the compulsory purchase of Lands for the Railways by that Act authorised; and for other purposes.
Dagenham (Thames) Dock Company's Act 1870	33 & 34 Vict. c. clxii	9 August 1870
An Act for facilitating the Sale and Transfer of the Property or Undertaking of the Dagenham (Thames) Dock Company, in liquidation; and for other purposes.
Newry and Greenore Railway Acts Amendment Act 1870	33 & 34 Vict. c. clxiii	9 August 1870
An Act for extending the Powers of the Newry and Greenore Railway Company.
Poole and Bournemouth Railway Act 1870	33 & 34 Vict. c. clxiv	9 August 1870
An Act for extending the time for the completion of the Poole and Bournemouth Railway, and of which the short title is "Poole and Bournemouth Railway Act, 1870."
Local Government Supplemental (No. 2) Act 1870 (repealed)	33 & 34 Vict. c. clxv	10 August 1870
An Act to confirm a Provisional Order under "The Local Government Act, 1858," relating to the district of Merthyr Tydfil. (Repealed by Mid Glamorgan County Council Act 1987 (c. vii))
	Merthyr Tydfil Order 1870 Provisional Order putting in force the Lands Clauses Consolidation Act, 1845, within the District of Merthyr Tydfil Local Board of Health, for the Purchase of Lands by the said Board for purposes of Sewage Irrigation.	
Glyn Valley Tramway Act 1870	33 & 34 Vict. c. clxvi	10 August 1870
An Act for dissolving the Ellesmere and Glyn Valley Railway Company and reincorporating the same as "The Glyn Valley Tramway Company," with power to construct Tramways; and for other purposes,
Pimlico, Peckham and Greenwich Street Tramways Act 1870	33 & 34 Vict. c. clxvii	10 August 1870
An Act to authorise the Pimlico, Peckham, and Greenwich Street Tramways Company to construct additional passing places and to convert certain of their authorised Tramways into double lines of Tramway; and for other purposes.
Birmingham and Staffordshire Tramways Act 1870	33 & 34 Vict. c. clxviii	10 August 1870
An Act to authorise the Construction of Tramways from Birmingham in the county of Warwick to Handsworth, West Bromwich, and Tipton in the county of Stafford; and for other purposes.
Plymouth, Stonehouse and Devonport Tramways Act 1870 (repealed)	33 & 34 Vict. c. clxix	10 August 1870
An Act to authorise the Construction of Tramways in the towns of Plymouth, Stonehouse, and Devonport, in the county of Devon; and for other purposes. (Repealed by Plymouth City Council Act 1987 (c. iv))
Portsmouth Street Tramways Act 1870	33 & 34 Vict. c. clxx	10 August 1870
An Act to authorise the Construction of Street Tramways in the Borough of Portsmouth; and for other purposes.
London Street Tramways Act 1870	33 & 34 Vict. c. clxxi	10 August 1870
An Act to authorise the Construction of Street Tramways in certain parts of the Metropolis; and for other purposes.
North Metropolitan Tramways Act 1870	33 & 34 Vict. c. clxxii	10 August 1870
An Act to empower the North Metropolitan Tramways Company to construct new Street Tramways; and for other purposes.
Metropolitan Street Tramways Act 1870	33 & 34 Vict. c. clxxiii	10 August 1870
An Act to authorise the Metropolitan Street Tramways Company to extend their Tramways; and for other purposes.
Pimlico, Peckham and Greenwich Street Tramways (Extensions) Act 1870	33 & 34 Vict. c. clxxiv	10 August 1870
An Act to authorise the Pimlico, Peckham, and Greenwich Street Tramways Company to extend their authorised Tramways; and for other purposes.
Glasgow Street Tramways Act 1870 (repealed)	33 & 34 Vict. c. clxxv	10 August 1870
An Act to authorise the construction of Street Tramways in certain parts of the city of Glasgow and its suburbs; and for other purposes. (Repealed by Glasgow Corporation (Tramways Consolidation) Order Confirmation Act 1905 (5 Edw. 7. c. cxxviii) (Note: Incorrectly cited as "Glasgow Corpn.(Tramways Cons.) O.Confn. 1905 (c.cxxvii)" in the Chronological Table of Local Acts.))
Liverpool Tramways Act 1870 (repealed)	33 & 34 Vict. c. clxxvi	10 August 1870
An Act for enabling the Liverpool Tramways Company to make new Street Tramways in Toxteth Park, in extension of their authorised undertaking; and for other purposes. (Repealed by Liverpool Corporation Act 1921 (11 & 12 Geo. 5. c. lxxiv))
Birmingham Tramways Act 1870	33 & 34 Vict. c. clxxvii	10 August 1870
An Act to authorise the Construction of Street Tramways in certain parts of the Suburbs of Birmingham; and for other purposes.

=== Private acts ===
Short title	Citation	Royal assent
Long title
Chelsea Rectory Act 1870	33 & 34 Vict. c. 1 Pr.	20 June 1870
An Act to enlarge the Powers of an Act (Note: Chelsea Rectory Estate Act 1825 (6 Geo. 4. c. 18 Pr.)) enabling the Rector of the Parish of Saint Luke, Chelsea, in Middlesex, to grant Building and Repairing Leases.
Owens Extension College, Manchester Act 1870	33 & 34 Vict. c. 2 Pr.	4 July 1870
An Act for the Extension of the Owens College, Manchester; and for other purposes.
Cornwallis Estate Act 1870	33 & 34 Vict. c. 3 Pr.	1 August 1870
An Act for enabling the trustees of the will of the late Right Honorable James Mann Earl Cornwallis, deceased, to improve and develop his estate at Hastings; and for other purposes.
Rattray's Estate Act 1870	33 & 34 Vict. c. 4 Pr.	1 August 1870
An Act to amend "An Act to authorise the borrowing of money on the security of the entailed estate of Downie Park, in the county of Forfar, or the sale of a portion of the estate, for the purpose of paying the debts and legacies affecting the same;" (Note: Rattray's Estate Act 1865 (28 & 29 Vict. c. 8 Pr.)) and to make farther provision for the sale of the estate.

=== Sources ===
- 33 & 34 Victoria - 1870 – via Internet Archive.
- Public General Statutes – via Google Books.
- Journal of the House of Commons (PDF). Vol. 125. London: His Majesty's Stationery Office. pp. 3–491 – via Parliament of the United Kingdom.
- Chronological Table of and Index to the Statutes. Vol. 1: To the End of the Session 59 Vict. Sess. 2 (1895) (13th ed.). London: Her Majesty's Stationery Office. 1896. pp. 450–455 – via Google Books.

== See also ==
- List of acts of the Parliament of the United Kingdom
