= Gunthorpe Bridge =

Bridge in Nottinghamshire, England

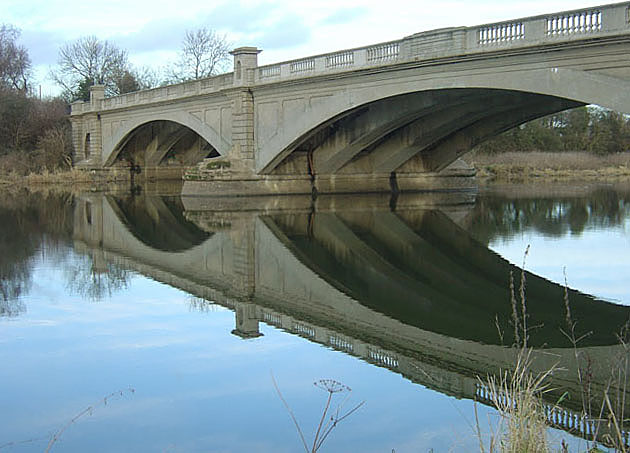
- Photo of New Gunthorpe Bridge
- Coordinates: 52.9862°N 0.9874°W
- Carries: A6097
- Crosses: River Trent

Characteristics
- Longest span: 38.1 metres (125 ft)

History
- Opened: Old Bridge c1925. New Bridge c1927.

Location
- Interactive map of Gunthorpe Bridge

Gunthorpe Bridge refers two crossings across the River Trent at Gunthorpe, Nottinghamshire. The first cast-iron bridge was built in the Victorian era using a local act of Parliament. However due to its weak load limit, the advent of heavier motor vehicles resulted in a replacement crossing being built further upstream in the 1920s.

== History ==
=== Original bridge ===
Gunthorpe Bridge Act 1870
- Act of Parliament
- Parliament of the United Kingdom
- Long title: An Act to authorise the construction of a Bridge over the river Trent in the county of Nottingham, and Roads and Approaches thereto, to be called "the Gunthorpe Bridge."
- Citation: 33 & 34 Vict. c. xxxii

Dates
- Royal assent: 20 June 1870

Other legislation
- Repealed by: Nottinghamshire County Council (Gunthorpe Bridge) Act 1925

Status: Repealed

Text of statute as originally enacted

Until 1875, the only way to cross the River Trent at this point was to use a ferry or ford. This was limiting commerce in the area so the British Parliament agreed that a permanent crossing was required. The Gunthorpe Bridge Company was formed following the passing of the Gunthorpe Bridge Act 1870 (33 & 34 Vict. c. xxxii). Capital of £7,500 (equivalent to $910,000 in 2023), to build the cast-iron truss bridge was raised through the sale of £10 shares. The foundation stone was laid in 1873 and the new bridge opened to traffic in 1875.

Crossing tolls were set as follows:

- horse and carriage 1/-,
- horse and wagon 6d,
- horse alone 3d,
- people and passengers 1d,
- motorcycles 3d,
- cars 1/-
- lorries 2/6,

=== Second bridge ===
Nottinghamshire County Council (Gunthorpe Bridge) Act 1925
- Act of Parliament
- Parliament of the United Kingdom
- Long title: An Act to authorise the County Council of the administrative county of Nottingham to acquire the undertaking of the Gunthorpe Bridge Company to authorise the County Council to construct a new bridge at Gunthorpe across the River Trent and for other purposes.
- Citation: 15 & 16 Geo. 5. c. lvii

Dates
- Royal assent: 31 July 1925

Other legislation
- Repealed by: Nottinghamshire County Council Act 1985

Status: Repealed

Text of statute as originally enacted

The Victorian structure began to show its age with the introduction of motor vehicles. With a maximum limit of 6,000 kg (13,000 lb), heavier commercial traffic such as trucks and vans were unable to use the crossing. The Nottinghamshire County Council (Gunthorpe Bridge) Act 1925 (15 & 16 Geo. 5. c. lvii) empowered Nottinghamshire County Council to buy out the Gunthorpe Bridge Company, demolish the old bridge and replace it with the present one.

The current bridge, which is a three span, reinforced concrete arch bridge, was built in 1927. It is 400 m (1,300 ft) upstream from Old Gunthorpe Bridge. In conjunction with the new bridge, was a new bypass around the village of Gunthorpe and East Bridgford. The central arch has a span of 38 m (125 ft) while the two side arches span 31 m (102 ft). All three arches are supported by four concrete ribs.

== See also ==
Next road crossing upstream	River Trent	Next road crossing downstream
Lady Bay Bridge; A6011	Gunthorpe Bridge; A6097; Grid reference SK680436	A617; Kelham Bridge
Next bridge upstream	River Trent	Next bridge downstream
Rectory Junction Viaduct	Gunthorpe Bridge; A6097; Grid reference SK680436	Averham Viaduct

- List of crossings of the River Trent
