= Turnpike Roads Act 1822 =

Act of the Parliament of the United Kingdom

Turnpike Roads Act 1822 (Note: The citation of this act by this short title was authorised by section 1 of, and the first schedule to, the Short Titles Act 1896. Due to the repeal of those provisions it is now authorised by section 19(2) of the Interpretation Act 1978.)
- Act of Parliament
- Parliament of the United Kingdom
- Long title: An Act to amend the general Laws now in being for regulating Turnpike Roads in that Part of Great Britain called England.
- Citation: 3 Geo. 4. c. 126
- Introduced by: Thomas Frankland Lewis MP (Commons)
- Territorial extent: United Kingdom

Dates
- Royal assent: 6 August 1822
- Commencement: 1 January 1823 (Note: Section 1.)
- Repealed: 21 May 1981
Other legislation
Amends	See § Repealed enactments
Repeals/revokes	See § Repealed enactments
Amended by	Turnpike Roads (Tolls on Lime) Act 1823; Turnpike Roads Act 1823; Criminal Law Act 1826; Turnpike Roads (England) Act 1827; Criminal Statutes Repeal Act 1827; Turnpike Roads (England) Act 1828; Turnpike Tolls (Allowance of Wagon Weights) Act 1834; Post Office (Repeal of Laws) Act 1837; Turnpikes Act 1840; Post Office (Duties) Act 1840; Highway Act 1841; South Wales Turnpike Trusts Act 1844; Statute Law Revision Act 1873; Highways and Locomotives (Amendment) Act 1878; Statute Law Revision Act 1890; Statute Law Revision Act 1950; Highways Act 1959
Repealed by	Statute Law (Repeals) Act 1981
Relates to	Highways Act 1766; Turnpike Roads Act 1766; Highways (No. 2) Act 1766; Highways Act 1768; Highways Act 1773; Turnpike Roads Act 1773

Status: Repealed

Text of statute as originally enacted

The Turnpike Roads Act 1822 (3 Geo. 4. c. 126), also known as the General Turnpike Act 1822, was an act of the Parliament of the United Kingdom that consolidated all enactments relating to turnpike roads in England and Wales.

== Background ==
The first legislated control in England was introduced under the Highways Act 1555 (2 & 3 Ph. & M. c. 8), which was amended and extended by the Highways Act 1562 (5 Eliz. 1. c. 13).

In 1663, the Road Repair (Hertfordshire, Cambridgeshire, and Huntingdonshire) Act 1663 (15 Cha. 2. c. 1) was passed to authorise the charging of rates for a section of the Great North Road in Hertfordshire, Bedfordshire and Huntingdonshire, becoming the first turnpike act. From the late 17th-century, Parliament increasingly took responsibility for repairing and maintaining roads from local authorities.

From 1700 to 1750, 143 new turnpike acts were passed, followed by a period of "turnpike mania", during which 375 new trusts were created between 1751 and 1772.

In response to the increased development and congestion of roads in England, the Highways Act 1766 (6 Geo. 3. c. 43), Highways (No. 2) Act 1766 (7 Geo. 3. c. 42), the Highways Act 1768 (8 Geo. 3. c. 5) and the Turnpike Roads Act 1766 (7 Geo. 3. c. 40) were passed to improve their regulation.

In 1773, the Highways Act 1773 (13 Geo. 3. c. 78) and the Turnpike Roads Act 1773 (13 Geo. 3. c. 84) were passed, which consolidated acts relating to highways and turnpikes in England and Wales.

== Passage ==
Leave to bring in the Turnpikes Laws Bill to the House of Commons was granted on 13 March 1822 to Thomas Frankland Lewis MP and Davies Gilbert MP. The bill had its first reading in the House of Commons on 14 March 1822, presented by the Thomas Frankland Lewis MP. The bill had its second reading in the House of Commons on 19 March 1822 and was committed to a committee of the whole house, which met and reported on 22 March 1822, with amendments. The amended bill was considered on 26 March 1822 and was committed to a select committee, which was appointed on 26 March 1822, enlarged on 17 April 1822 and reported on 24 May 1822, with amendments. The amended bill was considered on 8 July 1822 was re-committed to a committee of the whole house, which met and reported on 13 July 1822, with amendments. The amended bill was re-committed to a committee of the whole house, which met and reported on 17 July 1822. The amended bill had its third reading in the House of Commons on 23 July 1822 and passed, without amendments.

The bill had its first reading in the House of Lords on 24 July 1822. The bill had its second reading in the House of Lords on 26 July 1822 and was committed to a committee of the whole house, which met on 31 July 1822 and reported on 1 August 1822, with amendments. The amended bill had its third reading in the House of Lords on 2 August 1822 and passed, without amendments.

The amended bill was considered and agreed to by the House of Commons on 5 August 1822.

The bill was granted royal assent on 6 August 1822.

== Provisions ==
=== Repealed enactments ===
Section 1 of the act repealed 16 enactments, listed in that section.

Section 2 of the act provided that the repeals would not revive any repealed acts.

Section 3 of the act provided that all penalties and offences committed under the repealed acts before their repeal could still be prosecuted under the repealed acts.

Citation	Short title	Description	Extent of repeal
13 G. 3. c. 84	Turnpike Roads Act 1773	An Act passed in the Thirteenth Year of the Reign of His late Majesty King George the Third, intituled An Act to explain, amend and reduce into One Act of Parliament, the general Laws now in being for regulating the Turnpike Roads in that Part of Great Britain called England, and for other Purposes.	The whole act.
14 G. 3. c. 14	Turnpike Roads Act 1774	An Act passed in the Fourteenth Year of His said late Majesty's Reign, intituled An Act to repeal a Clause in an Act made in the Thirteenth Year of His present Majesty's Reign, intituled 'An Act to explain, amend and reduce into One Act of Parliament, the general Laws now in being for regulating the Turnpike Roads in that Part of Great Britain called England, and for other Purposes, which regulates the Width of the Wheels, and the Length of Carriages liable to be weighed, and for indemnifying Persons who have offended against the said Clause.	The whole act.
14 G. 3. c. 36	Turnpike Roads (No. 2) Act 1774	An Act passed in the Fourteenth Year of His said late Majesty's Reign, intituled An Act to explain and amend an Act made in the Thirteenth Year of His present Majesty's Reign, intituled 'An Act to explain, amend and reduce into One Act of Parliament, the general Laws now in being for regulating the Turnpike Roads in that Part of Great Britain called England, and for other Purposes, so far as the same relates to the continuing and granting an additional Term of Five Years to Acts made for repairing Turnpike Roads.	The whole act.
14 G. 3. c. 57	Turnpikes Act 1774	An Act passed in the Fourteenth Year of the Reign of His said late Majesty, intituled An Act to amend and carry into Execution an Act of the last Session of Parliament, for reducing into One Act the Laws relating to Side-Gates erected at Places specified in any Act of Parliament.	The whole act.
14 G. 3. c. 82	Turnpike Roads (No. 3) Act 1774	An Act made in the Fourteenth Year of His said late Majesty's Reign, intituled An Act for explaining and altering an Act made in the Thirteenth Year of His present Majesty, intituled An Act to explain, amend and reduce into One Act of Parliament, the general Laws now in being for regulating the Turnpike Roads in that Part of Great Britain called England, and for other Purposes, so far as the same relates to the Payment of additional Tolls at Weighing Engines, and the Number of Horses to be used in Carriages driven on Turnpike Roads, and for allowing certain Exemptions with respect to Weight and Payment of Toll in particular Cases.	The whole act.
16 G. 3. c. 39	Turnpike Roads Act 1776	An Act passed in the Sixteenth Year of His said late Majesty's Reign, intituled An Act for repealing a Clause in an Act made in the Thirteenth Year of the Reign of His present Majesty, intituled An Act to explain, amend and reduce into One Act of Parliament, the general Laws now in being for regulating the Turnpike Roads in that Part of Great Britain called England, and for other Purposes, which relates to the Construction of the Tire of the Wheels of all Persons, Teams and Carriages to be used on Turnpike Roads; and for explaining a Provision in the said Act, with respect to the Fellies and Tire of Carriages having the Fellies of the Wheels of the Gauge of Six Inches or upwards.	The whole act.
16 G. 3. c. 44	Turnpike Roads (No. 2) Act 1776	An Act passed in the Seventeenth Year of His said late Majesty's Reign, intituled An Act for amending, for a limited Time, so much of an Act made in the Thirteenth Year of His present Majesty's Reign, intituled An Act to explain, amend and reduce into One Act of Parliament, the general Laws now in being for regulating the Turnpike Roads in that Part of Great Britain called England, and for other Purposes, as to subject Carriages having the Fellies of the Wheels thereof of less Breadth or Gauge than Six Inches to the Payment of Double Tolls, and for vacating Contracts for leasing Tolls.	The whole act.
17 G. 3. c. 16	Turnpike Roads (No. 3) Act 1776	An Act passed in the Seventeenth Year of His said late Majesty's Reign, intituled An Act for limiting the Exemption from Tolls (granted by any Act or Acts of Parliament for repairing Turnpike Roads,) on account of Cattle going to and from Water or Pasture.	The whole act.
18 G. 3. c. 28	Turnpike Roads Act 1778	An Act passed in the Eighteenth Year of His said late Majesty's Reign, intituled An Act for repealing so much of an Act made in the Thirteenth Year of His present Majesty's Reign, intituled An Act to explain, amend and reduce into One Act of Parliament, the general Laws now in being for regulating the Turnpike Roads in that Part of Great Britain called England, and for other Purposes, as subjects Carriages having the Fellies of the Wheels thereof of less Breadth or Gauge than Six Inches to the Payment of Double Tolls, and for vacating Contracts for leasing Tolls.	The whole act.
18 G. 3. c. 63	Turnpike Roads (No. 2) Act 1778	An Act passed in the Eighteenth Year of His said late Majesty's Reign, intituled An Act for enabling Trustees under particular Turnpike Acts to meet and carry such Acts into Execution, notwithstanding they may not have met or adjoined agreeably to the Directions of such Acts, and for preventing Disputes touching the Payment of Tolls for Horses or Carriages belonging to or employed by Officers or Soldiers on Duty.	The whole act.
21 G. 3. c. 20	Turnpike Roads Act 1781	An Act passed in the Twenty first Year of His said late Majesty's Reign, intituled An Act for declaring certain Provisions of an Act made in the Thirteenth Year of His present Majesty, relating to the Turnpike Roads in that Part of Great Britain called England, to extend to all Acts made and to be made for repairing Roads subsequent to the passing of the said Act.	The whole act.
25 G. 3. c. 57	Turnpike Toll Act 1785	An Act passed in the Twenty fifth Year of His said late Majesty's Reign, intituled An Act to exempt Carriages carrying the Mail from paying Tolls at any Turnpike Gate in Great Britain.	The whole act.
52 G. 3. c. 145	Exemption from Toll Act 1812	An Act passed in the Fifty second Year of His said late Majesty's Reign, intituled An Act to explain the Exemption from Toll in several Acts of Parliament, for Carriages employed in Husbandry, and for regulating the Tolls to be paid on other Carriages and on Horses, in certain other Cases therein specified.	The whole act.
53 G. 3. c. 82	Tolls for Certain Carriages Act 1813	An Act passed in the Fifty third Year of His said late Majesty's Reign, intituled An Act to amend an Act made in the Fifty second Year of His present Majesty's Reign, intituled 'An Act to explain the Exemption from Toll in several Acts of Parliament, for Carriages employed in Husbandry, and for regulating the Tolls to be paid on other Carriages and on Horses in certain other Cases therein specified,' and for other Purposes relating thereto.	The whole act.
55 G. 3. c. 119	Turnpike Roads Act 1815	An Act passed in the Fifty fifth Year of His said late Majesty's Reign, intituled An Act to enable the Trustees of Turnpike Roads to abate the Tolls on Carriages, and to allow of their carrying extra Weights in certain Cases.	The whole act.
57 G. 3. c. 37	Turnpike Roads Act 1817	An Act passed in the Fifty seventh Year of His said late Majesty's Reign, intituled An Act to explain and amend an Act of the Fifty third Year of His present Majesty, relating to Tolls on Carriages used in Husbandry, and to remove Doubts as to Exemption of Carriages not wholly laden with Manure from Payment of Toll.	The whole act.

== Subsequent developments ==
The act was immediately amended in the following session by the Turnpike Roads Act 1823 (4 Geo. 4. c. 95).

The whole act, except sections 97–103, 118 and 124 were declared to be local and personal by section 1 of, and the first schedule to, the Statute Law Revision Act 1890 (53 & 54 Vict. c. 33), which came into force on 4 August 1890.

Section 32 of the act was repealed by section 1(1) of, and the first schedule to, the Statute Law Revision Act 1950 (14 Geo. 6. c. 6), which came into force on 23 May 1950.

The whole act was repealed by section 1(1) of, and part X of schedule 1 to, the Statute Law (Repeals) Act 1981, which came into force on 21 May 1981.
