= United Kingdom traffic laws =

United Kingdom traffic laws comprise the statutes and regulations governing road usage, vehicle operation, driver conduct, and traffic enforcement across England, Wales, Scotland, and Northern Ireland.

== Present laws (Great Britain) ==
- Highways Act 1980 (England and Wales)
- Roads (Scotland) Act 1984 (Scotland)
- Road Traffic Regulation Act 1984
- Road Traffic Act 1988
- Road Traffic Offenders Act 1988
- Traffic Signs Regulations and General Directions, initially introduced on 1 January 1965
- The Highway Code (Great Britain edition), not law but a set of information, advice, guides and mandatory rules for road users

== History ==
- Turnpike Roads Act 1766
- Highways Act 1773
- Turnpike Roads Act 1773
- Turnpike Roads Act 1822
- Highway Act 1835
- Locomotive Acts
- Highway Act 1864
- Locomotives on Highways Act 1896
- Motor Car Act 1903
- Roads Act 1920
- Road Traffic Act 1930
- Road Traffic Act 1934
- Road Traffic Act 1960
- Road Traffic Regulation Act 1967
- Road Traffic Act 1972
- Road Traffic Act 1988
- Road Traffic Offenders Act 1988

== Offences that apply to all vehicles ==
Causing bodily harm by wanton or furious driving

== Motor vehicle offences ==
- Causing death by dangerous driving
- Dangerous driving
- Careless driving/Driving without due care and attention

Motor vehicle document offences: see English criminal law#Forgery, personation and cheating

And see Drink driving (United Kingdom)

== Bicycles ==
- Taylor v Goodwin (1879) 4 QBD 228 bicycles are defined as "carriages" and therefore not allowed on pavements; biker convicted for "furious" cycling.
- Cycle Tracks Act 1984, allows footpaths to be converted into cycle paths
- Highway Act 1835 s 72 (as amended by Local Government Act 1888 s 85(1)) prohibits cycling on footways (pavement beside carriageway). The fixed penalty is £30 under the Road Traffic Offenders Act 1988 s 51 and Sch 3.
- Crank v Brooks [1980] RTR 441, a person wheeling a bicycle over a zebra crossing remains a pedestrian if they were on foot before, during and after the act of crossing there, per Waller LJ,
  In my judgment a person who is walking across a pedestrian crossing pushing a bicycle, having started on the pavement on one side on her feet and not on the bicycle, and going across pushing the bicycle with both feet on the ground so to speak is clearly a 'foot passenger'. If for example she had been using it as a scooter by having one foot on the pedal and pushing herself along, she would not have been a 'foot passenger'. But the fact that she had the bicycle in her hand and was walking does not create any difference from a case where she is walking without a bicycle in her hand.
- Licensing Act 1872, an offence to be drunk and in charge of a bike.
- Road Traffic Act 1988 s 30, creates an offence for being incapable of having proper control, not necessarily being a bit drunk.
  A person who, when riding a cycle on a road or other public place, is unfit to ride through drink or drugs (that is to say, is under the influence of drink or a drug to such an extent as to be incapable of having proper control of the cycle) is guilty of an offence.
- Maximum penalty for dangerous cycling is £2500.
- £30 fine for running a red light.
- Road Vehicles (Construction and Use) Regulations 1986, amended 2003, cyclists not included in law making it illegal to talk on a mobile phone.

== Northern Ireland ==
=== Present laws ===
- Motor Vehicles and Road Traffic Act (Northern Ireland) 1930
- Road Traffic (Northern Ireland) Order 1981
- The Roads (Northern Ireland) Order 1993
- The Road Traffic (Northern Ireland) Order 1995
- The Road Traffic Offenders (Northern Ireland) Order 1996
- The Road Traffic Regulation (Northern Ireland) Order 1997
- The Road Traffic (New Drivers) (Northern Ireland) Order 1998
- The Road Traffic (Northern Ireland) Order 2007
- Traffic Signs Regulations (Northern Ireland) 1997
- The Highway Code (Northern Ireland edition)

=== Offences that apply to all vehicles ===
Causing bodily harm by wanton or furious driving

=== Motor vehicle offences ===
- Causing death or grievous bodily injury by dangerous driving
- Dangerous driving

== See also ==
- Transport in the United Kingdom
