= Turnpike Roads Act 1773 =

Act of the Parliament of Great Britain

- Act of Parliament
- Parliament of Great Britain
- Long title: An Act to explain, amend, and reduce into One Act of Parliament, the General Laws now in being for regulating the Turnpike Roads in that Part of Great Britain called England; and for other Purposes.
- Citation: 13 Geo. 3. c. 84
- Territorial extent: Great Britain

Dates
- Royal assent: 1 July 1773
- Commencement: 29 September 1773 (Note: Section 86.)
- Repealed: 1 January 1823
Other legislation
Repeals/revokes	Turnpike Roads Act 1766
Amended by	Turnpike Roads Act 1774; Turnpikes Act 1774
Repealed by	Turnpike Roads Act 1822
Relates to	Highways Act 1766; Turnpike Roads Act 1766; Highways (No. 2) Act 1766; Highways Act 1768; Highways Act 1773

Status: Repealed

Text of statute as originally enacted

Turnpike Roads Act 1774
- Act of Parliament
- Parliament of Great Britain
- Long title: An Act to repeal a Clause in an Act, made in the Thirteenth Year of His present Majesty’s Reign, intituled, "An Act to explain, amend, and reduce into One Act of Parliament, the General Laws now in being for regulating the Turnpike Roads in that Part of Great Britain called England, and for other Purposes;" which regulates the Width of the Wheels, and the Length of Carriages liable to be weighed; and for indemnifying Persons who have offended against the said Clause.
- Citation: 14 Geo. 3. c. 14
- Territorial extent: Great Britain

Dates
- Royal assent: 31 March 1774
- Commencement: 27 November 1744 (Note: Start of session.)
- Repealed: 1 January 1823
Other legislation
Amends	Turnpike Roads Act 1773
Repealed by	Turnpike Roads Act 1822

Status: Repealed

Text of statute as originally enacted

The Turnpike Roads Act 1773 (13 Geo. 3. c. 84), also known as the General Turnpike Act 1773, was an act of the Parliament of Great Britain that consolidated all acts relating to turnpike roads in England and Wales.

== Background ==
The first legislated control in England was introduced under the Highways Act 1555 (2 & 3 Ph. & M. c. 8), which was amended and extended by the Highways Act 1562 (5 Eliz. 1. c. 13).

In 1663, the Road Repair (Hertfordshire, Cambridgeshire, and Huntingdonshire) Act 1663 (15 Cha. 2. c. 1) was passed to authorise the charging of rates for a section of the Great North Road in Hertfordshire, Bedfordshire and Huntingdonshire, becoming the first turnpike act. From the late 17th-century, Parliament increasingly took responsibility for repairing and maintaining roads from local authorities.

From 1700 to 1750, 143 new turnpike acts were passed, followed by a period of "turnpike mania", during which 375 new trusts were created between 1751 and 1772.

In response to the increased development and congestion of roads in England, the Highways Act 1766 (6 Geo. 3. c. 43), Highways (No. 2) Act 1766 (7 Geo. 3. c. 42), the Highways Act 1768 (8 Geo. 3. c. 5) and the Turnpike Roads Act 1766 (7 Geo. 3. c. 40) were passed to improve their regulation.

== Provisions ==
The act made statutory provision for the erection of milestones along the turnpike roads indicating the distance between the main towns on the road, known as "guide posts" or "fingerposts". Users of the road were obliged to follow what were to become rules of the road, such as driving on the left and not damaging the road surface. Trusts could take additional tolls during the summer to pay for watering the road in order to lay the dust thrown up by fast-moving vehicles.

Section 86 of the act repealed the Turnpike Roads Act 1766 (7 Geo. 3. c. 40), effective on 29 September 1773.

== Subsequent developments ==
The Highways Act 1773 (13 Geo. 3. c. 78) was passed at the same time as the act, which consolidated all acts relating to highways in England and Wales.

The Select Committee on Temporary Laws described this act as a Consolidation Act.

The whole act was repealed by section 1 of the Turnpike Roads Act 1822 (3 Geo. 4. c. 126), which came into force on 1 January 1823.
