= Highways Act 1750 =

Act of the Parliament of Great Britain

- Act of Parliament
- Parliament of Great Britain
- Long title: An Act for the more effectual Preservation of the Turnpike Roads in that Part of Great Britain called England; and for the Disposition of Penalties given by Acts of Parliament relating to Highways; and for the more effectual preventing the Mischiefs occasioned by the Drivers riding upon Carts, Drays, Cars, and Waggons, in the City of London and within Ten Miles thereof.
- Citation: 24 Geo. 2. c. 43
- Territorial extent: Great Britain]

Dates
- Royal assent: 25 June 1751
- Commencement: 25 March 1752 (Note: Section 6.); 1 July 1752 (Note: Section 1.)
- Repealed: 30 July 1948
Other legislation
| Repealed by | Highways Act 1773; Highway Act 1835; Statute Law Revision Act 1948 |
| Relates to | Preservation of Roads Act 1740 |

Status: Repealed

Text of statute as originally enacted

The Highways Act 1750 (24 Geo. 2. c. 43) was an act of the Parliament of Great Britain concerning the maintenance and management of public highways in England and Wales. It formed part of a sequence of 18th-century statutes intended to improve the condition of roads prior to the widespread use of turnpike trusts. The Act amended earlier highway legislation and sought to strengthen local administrative obligations for road upkeep.

== Background ==
Road conditions in mid-18th-century Britain were governed primarily by the Highways Act 1555 (2 & 3 Ph. & M. c. 8) and later amendments. Responsibility for repairs rested with parishes, which were required to provide labour and materials. By the early 1700s, this system was widely considered inefficient. Parliament introduced a series of reforms to increase compliance and clarify obligations, including the Highways Act 1715 (1 Geo. 1. St. 2. c. 52) and subsequent amendments. The 1750 Act continued this process by tightening enforcement and adjusting procedural requirements.

== Provisions ==
| Provision | Description | Source |
|---|---|---|
| Preservation of turnpike roads | The Act focused on the more effectual preservation of turnpike (toll) roads in England. Duties and powers were kept to keep them repaired. | |
| Disposition of penalties | Makes provision for the disposition (recovery/use) of penalties given by earlier Highway Acts and enforces their recovery. | |
| Prevention of drivers riding on carts in London | Includes measures "for the more effectual preventing the Mischiefs occasioned by the Drivers riding upon Carts, Drays, Cars, and Waggons, in the City of London and within Ten Miles thereof." | |
| Enforcement procedures/recovery | Provisions to enforce recovery of penalties and ensure compliance by local officers/surveyors. | |

== Subsequent developments ==
The act was later superseded by later 18th-century reforms, including the Highways Act 1766 (6 Geo. 3. c. 43) and Highways Act 1773 (13 Geo. 3. c. 78), which continued restructuring parish-based road administration.

The whole act, so far as unrepealed, was repealed by section 1 of, and the first schedule to, the Statute Law Revision Act 1948 (11 & 12 Geo. 6. c. 62), which came into force on 30 July 1948.
