= List of UK driving licence endorsements =

UK driving licences may be endorsed by order of the courts if the driver has been convicted of an offence concerned with driving or operating a vehicle. An endorsement may also be accompanied by a number of points which can remain on the licence for up to 11 years. If the total number of points on a licence equals or exceeds 12, the courts must ban the driver for a period of time, usually six months. New drivers (those who passed their first driving test within the past two years) are subject to a lower threshold of six points, which when reached results in the full licence being revoked; the driver is not banned but must re-apply for a licence, with provisional licence and tests.

The list below does not apply to Northern Ireland; see the website below. However, 'Mutual Recognition' (MR) codes have been included; these are added to the driving record of a driver from Great Britain disqualified while driving in Northern Ireland, the Isle of Man, or the Republic of Ireland. The disqualification extends to Great Britain, and stays on the record for 4 years from the date of conviction.

Code	Description	Penalty points	Period endorsements remain on licence (years)
AC10	Failing to stop after an accident	5 - 10	4
AC20	Failing to give particulars or to report an accident within 24 hours	5 - 10	4
AC30	Undefined accident offences	4 - 9	4
BA10	Driving while disqualified by order of Court	6	4
BA30	Attempting to drive while disqualified by order of Court	6	4
BA40	Causing death by driving while disqualified	3 - 11	4
BA60	Causing serious injury by driving while disqualified	3 - 11	4
CD10	Driving without due care and attention	3 - 9	4
CD20	Driving without reasonable consideration for other road users	3 - 9	4
CD30	Driving without due care and attention/reasonable consideration	3 - 9	4
CD33	Causing serious injury by careless or inconsiderate driving	3 - 9	4
CD40	Causing death through careless driving when unfit through drink	3 - 11	11
CD50	Causing death by careless driving when unfit through drugs	3 - 11	11
CD60	Causing death by careless driving when alcohol level above limit	3 - 11	11
CD70	Causing death by careless driving then failing to supply a specimen for alcohol analysis	3 - 11	11
CD80	Causing death by careless, or inconsiderate, driving	3 - 11	4
CD90	Causing death by driving: unlicensed, disqualified or uninsured drivers	3 - 11	4
CU10	Using a vehicle with defective brakes	3	4
CU20	Causing or likely to cause danger by reason of use of unsuitable vehicle or using a vehicle with parts or accessories (excluding brakes, steering or tyres) in a dangerous condition	3	4
CU30	Using a vehicle with defective tyre(s)	3	4
CU40	Using a vehicle with defective steering	3	4
CU50	Causing or likely to cause danger by reason of load or passengers	3	4
CU80	Breach of requirements as to control of the vehicle, mobile telephone etc.	3 - 6	4
DD10	Causing serious injury by dangerous driving	3 - 11	4
DD40	Dangerous Driving	3 - 11	4
DD60	Manslaughter or culpable homicide while driving a vehicle	3 - 11	4
DD80	Causing death by dangerous driving	3 - 11	4
DD90	Furious driving	3 - 9	4
DR10	Driving or attempting to drive with alcohol concentration above limit	3 - 11	11
DR20	Driving or attempting to drive when unfit through drink	3 - 11	11
DR30	Driving or attempting to drive then refusing to provide a specimen	3 - 11	11
DR31	Driving or attempting to drive then refusing to give permission for analysis of a blood sample that was taken without consent due to incapacity	3 - 11	11
DR40	In charge of a vehicle while alcohol level above limit	10	4
DR50	In charge of a vehicle while unfit through drink	10	4
DR60	Failure to provide a specimen for analysis in circumstances other than driving or attempting to drive	10	4
DR61	Refusing to give permission for analysis of a blood sample that was taken without consent due to incapacity in circumstances other than driving or attempting to drive	10	11
DR70	Failing to provide specimen for breath test	4	4
DG10	Driving or attempting to drive with drug level above the specified limit	3 - 11	11
DG40	In charge of a vehicle while drug level above specified limit	10	4
DG60	Causing death by careless driving with drug level above the limit	3 - 11	11
DR80	Driving or attempting to drive when unfit through drugs	3 - 11	11
DR90	In charge of a vehicle when unfit through drugs	10	4
IN10	Using a vehicle uninsured against third party risks	6 - 8	4
LC20	Driving otherwise than in accordance with a licence	3 - 6	4
LC30	Driving after making a false declaration about fitness when applying for a licence	3 - 6	4
LC40	Driving a vehicle having failed to notify a disability	3 - 6	4
LC50	Driving after a licence has been revoked or refused on medical grounds	3 - 6	4
MS10	Leaving a vehicle in a dangerous position	3	4
MS20	Unlawful pillion riding	3	4
MS30	Playstreet Offence	2	4
MS50	Motor racing on the highway	3 - 11	4
MS60	Offences not covered by other codes (including offences relating to breach of requirements as to control of vehicle)	3	4
MS70	Driving with uncorrected defective eyesight	3	4
MS80	Refusing to submit to an eyesight test	3	4
MS90	Failing to give information as to identity of driver etc.	6	4
MW10	Contravention of Special Roads Regulations (excluding speed limits)	3	4
PC10	Undefined contravention of Pedestrian crossing Regulations	3	4
PC20	Contravention of Pedestrian crossing Regulations with moving vehicle	3	4
PC30	Contravention of Pedestrian crossing Regulations Stationary vehicle	3	4
SP10	Exceeding goods vehicle speed limit	3 - 6	4
SP20	Exceeding speed limit for type of vehicle (excluding goods or passenger vehicles)	3 - 6	4
SP30	Exceeding statutory speed limit on a public road	3 - 6	4
SP40	Exceeding passenger vehicle speed limit	3 - 6	4
SP50	Exceeding speed limit on a motorway	3 - 6	4
TS10	Failing to comply with traffic light signals	3	4
TS20	Failing to comply with double white lines	3	4
TS30	Failing to comply with a 'Stop' sign	3	4
TS40	Failing to comply with directions of a constable/traffic warden	3	4
TS50	Failing to comply with traffic sign (excluding ‘stop’ signs, traffic lights or double white lines)	3	4
TS60	Failing to comply with a school crossing patrol sign	3	4
TS70	Undefined failure to comply with a traffic direction sign	3	4
TT99	Disqualified for having more than 12 points in the "totting up" process	N/A	4 (Note: This endorsement replaced those relating to the offences that contributed to it)
UT50	Aggravated taking of a vehicle	3 - 11	4
MR09	Reckless or dangerous driving (whether or not resulting in death, injury or serious risk)	N/A	4
MR19	Wilful failure to carry out the obligation placed on driver after being involved in a road accident (hit and run)	N/A	4
MR29	Driving a vehicle while under the influence of alcohol or other substance affecting or diminishing the mental and physical abilities of a driver	N/A	4
MR39	Driving a vehicle faster than the permitted speed	N/A	4
MR49	Driving a vehicle whilst disqualified	N/A	4
MR59	Other conduct constituting an offence for which a driving disqualification has been imposed by the State of Offence	N/A	4

== Inchoate offences ==
Where a licence is endorsed for an inchoate offence, the endorsement code has the same letters and first digit as above, but with the final digit replaced by:

- 2, for aiding, abetting, counselling or procuring an offence
- 4, for causing or permitting an offence
- 6, for inciting an offence
