= Turnpike Roads Act 1766 =

Act of the Parliament of Great Britain

- Act of Parliament
- Parliament of Great Britain
- Long title: An Act to explain, amend, and reduce into one Act of Parliament, the General Laws now in Being, for regulating the Turnpike Roads of this Kingdom; and for other Purposes therein mentioned.
- Citation: 7 Geo. 3. c. 40
- Territorial extent: Great Britain

Dates
- Royal assent: 29 June 1767
- Commencement: 29 September 1767 (Note: Section 49.)
- Repealed: 29 September 1773
Other legislation
Amends	See § Repealed enactments
Repeals/revokes	See § Repealed enactments
Repealed by	Turnpike Roads Act 1773
Relates to	Highways Act 1766; Highways (No. 2) Act 1766; Highways Act 1768; Highways Act 1773; Turnpike Roads Act 1773

Status: Repealed

Text of statute as originally enacted

The Turnpike Roads Act 1766 (7 Geo. 3. c. 40), was an act of the Parliament of Great Britain that consolidated all acts relating to turnpike roads in England and Wales.

== Background ==
The first legislated control in England was introduced under the Highways Act 1555 (2 & 3 Ph. & M. c. 8), which was amended and extended by the Highways Act 1562 (5 Eliz. 1. c. 13).

In 1663, the Road Repair (Hertfordshire, Cambridgeshire, and Huntingdonshire) Act 1663 (15 Cha. 2. c. 1) was passed to authorise the charging of rates for a section of the Great North Road in Hertfordshire, Bedfordshire and Huntingdonshire, becoming the first turnpike act. From the late 17th-century, Parliament increasingly took responsibility for repairing and maintaining roads from local authorities.

From 1700 to 1750, 143 new turnpike acts were passed, followed by a period of "turnpike mania", during which 375 new trusts were created between 1751 and 1772.

In response to the increased development and congestion of roads in England, the Highways Act 1766 (6 Geo. 3. c. 43) was passed to improve their regulation.

== Provisions ==
=== Repealed enactments ===
Section 61 of the act repealed 13 enactments, listed in that section, effective from and after 28 September 1767.

Citation	Short title	Description	Extent of repeal
1 Geo. 2. St. 2. c. 19	Destruction of Turnpikes, etc. Act 1727	An act made in the first year of the reign of his late majesty King George the Second (intituled, An act for punishing such persons as shall wilfully and maliciously pull down or destroy turnpikes for repairing highways, or locks, or other works erected by authority of parliament, for making rivers navigable).	As relates to turnpikes.
5 Geo. 2. c. 33	Destruction of Turnpikes, etc. Act 1731	An act passed in the fifth year of his late majesty King George the Second (intituled, An act to explain, amend, and render more effectual, an act passed in the first year of his present Majesty's reign, intituled, An act for punishing such persons as shall wilfully and maliciously pull down or destroy turnpikes for repairing highways, or locks, or other works erected by authority of parliament, for making rivers navigable).	As relates to turnpikes.
8 Geo. 2. c. 20	Destruction of Turnpikes, etc. Act 1734	An act passed in the eighth year of his late majesty King George the Second (intituled, An act for rendering the laws more effectual for punishing such persons as shall wilfully and maliciously pull down or destroy turnpikes for repairing highways, or locks, or other works erected by act of parliament, for making rivers navigable; and for other purposes therein mentioned).	As relates to turnpikes.
14 Geo. 2. c. 42	Preservation of Roads Act 1740	An act passed in the fourteenth year of his late majesty King George the Second (intituled, An act for the preservation of the public roads in that part of Great Britain called England).	As relates to turnpike roads of this kingdom.
21 Geo. 2. c. 28	Highways Act 1747	An act passed in the twenty first year of his late majesty King George the Second (intituled, An act to explain and amend an act passed in the fourteenth year of his Majesty's reign, intituled, An act for the preservation of the public roads in that part of Great Britain called England) (Note: Preservation of Roads Act 1740 (14 Geo. 2. c. 42)) and so much of an act made in the third year of the reign of King William and Queen Mary (intituled, An act for the better repairing and amending the highways, and for settling the rates of the carriage of goods (Note: Highways, etc. Act 1691 (3 Will. & Mary, c. 12)), as relates to the settling the rates of the carriage of goods)	Except so much thereof as relates to the rate or price for carriage of goods.
24 Geo. 2. c. 43	Highways Act 1750	An act passed in the twenty fourth year of his late majesty King George the Second (intituled, An act for the more effectual preservation of the turnpike roads in that part of Great Britain called England, and for the disposition of penalties given by acts of parliament relating to the highways in that part of Great Britain called England, and for preventing the inconveniencies by the drivers using more than one mile thereof).	Except so much thereof as relates to the preventing mischief occasioned by the drivers passing with drays, carts, and waggons, in the city of London.
26 Geo. 2. c. 30	Highways and Turnpike Roads Act 1753	Another act passed in the twenty sixth year of the reign of his late majesty King George the Second (intituled, An act for the amendment and preservation of the public highways and turnpike roads of this kingdom, and for the more effectual execution of the acts relating thereto).	The whole.
28 Geo. 2. c. 17	Highways and Turnpike Roads Act 1755	An act passed in the twenty eighth year of his late act made in the twenty sixth year of the reign of his present Majesty, intituled, An act for the amendment and preservation of the public highways and turnpike roads of this kingdom, and for the more effectual execution of the laws relating thereto).	Except so much thereof as continues the acts then making for repairing and amending turnpike roads, subject to the tolls and duties by such acts respectively granted.
30 Geo. 2. c. 27	Highways and Turnpike Roads Act 1757	An act passed in the thirtieth year of his late majesty King George the Second (intituled, An act for enlarging the times for the first meetings of commissioners or trustees, for putting in execution certain acts of this session of parliament).	The whole.
30 Geo. 2. c. 28	Highways and Turnpike Roads (No. 2) Act 1757	Another act passed in the thirtieth year of his late majesty King George the Second (intituled, An act to render more effectual the several acts now in being, for the amendment and preservation of the public highways and turnpike roads of this kingdom).	The whole.
31 Geo. 2. c. 27	Highways and Turnpike Roads Act 1757	An act passed in the thirty first year of his late majesty King George the Second (intituled, An act for enlarging the times for the first meetings of commissioners or trustees, for putting in execution certain acts of this session of parliament, and for other purposes therein mentioned)	The whole.
5 Geo. 3. c.	Highways Act 1765	An act passed in the fifth year of the reign of his present Majesty (intituled, An act to continue part of an act made in the thirtieth year of the reign of his late majesty King George the Second, intituled, An act to render more effectual the several laws now in being, for the amendment and preservation of the public highways and turnpike roads of this kingdom, and for making further provisions for the preservation of the said roads).	The whole.
6 Geo. 3. c.	Highways Act 1766	An act passed in the sixth year of his present majesty (intituled, An act for explaining, amending, and further enforcing, the execution of two several acts, one made in the twenty sixth year of his late Majesty, and the other in the fifth year of his present Majesty's reign, for the amendment and preservation of the public highways and turnpike roads of this kingdom; and for obliging mortgagees taking possession of toll-gates on turnpike roads, and the collectors of such tolls, to account).	The whole.

== Subsequent developments ==
The Highways (No. 2) Act 1766 (7 Geo. 3. c. 42) was passed at the same time as the act, which consolidated all acts relating to highways in England and Wales.

The act was wholly repealed by the Turnpike Roads Act 1773 (13 Geo. 3. c. 84), which the Select Committee on Temporary Laws described this act as a Consolidation Act.
