= Vehicular homicide =

Criminal act

Vehicular homicide is a crime that involves the death of a person other than the driver as a result of either criminally negligent or murderous operation of a motor vehicle.

In cases of criminal negligence, the defendant is commonly charged with unintentional vehicular manslaughter. Vehicular homicide is similar to the offense, in some countries, of "dangerous driving causing death".

The victim may be either a person not in the car with the offending motorist (such as a pedestrian, cyclist, or another motorist), or a passenger in the vehicle with the offender.

== Jurisdictions ==
=== Canada ===
The Criminal Code of Canada does not have a specific offence for vehicular homicide, but has a series of provisions covering driving offences causing death, among them:

- dangerous driving causing death
- criminal negligence causing death
- failure to stop for police causing death
- street racing causing death
- impaired driving causing death
- hit and run driving causing death

The maximum penalty for dangerous driving causing death, absent any of the remaining 5 elements mentioned above, is 14 years' imprisonment. The maximum penalty is otherwise life imprisonment. There is no minimum sentence.

=== United Kingdom ===
In the United Kingdom, there is no offense of "vehicular homicide". Where a vehicle has been used as a weapon as part of a deliberate assault; and the intention was to kill or cause serious injury; and that assault resulted in the death of the victim then the driver may be charged with murder contrary to the Common Law.

Where death is the result of driving that falls short of a deliberate assault, the Road Traffic Act 1988 (RTA 88) governs the disposal of the case. The offenses created by this act relating to road deaths are as follows ...

- "Causing death by dangerous driving" - Section 1 RTA 88, the only points for the prosecution to prove are that death was caused and the driver of the vehicle that caused the death was driving dangerously.
- "Causing death by careless, or inconsiderate, driving" - Section 2B RTA 88, deals with cases similar in scope to Section 1 but while the standard of the driving remains reprehensible the lapse(s) alleged are considered to fall short of being actually dangerous.
- "Causing death by driving: unlicensed, disqualified or uninsured drivers" - Section 3ZB RTA 88, it is a requirement under UK law for the drivers of motor vehicles to be properly licensed and for them to hold third party insurance for their vehicle. This section was inserted to the RTA 88 to deal with road death cases where there was no provable lapse in driving standards but nevertheless the driver should not in law have been driving.
- and "Causing death by careless driving while unfit through alcohol/over prescribed limit", Section 3A RTA 88

The RTA 88 introduced the simple concept of dangerousness by removing the offence of "reckless driving" as the concept of recklessness in UK law requires a mens rea. This had been difficult to prove in court. C. M. V. Clarkson, an advocate of a vehicular homicide offense, opines that while people's perceptions are that death resulting from a motor vehicle is in a different "family" to other killings, "in terms of fault there can be little distinction between those who kill through the dangerous operation of their cars and those who kill with machines, trains, etc."

In addition to the above there also exists the option of charging offenders with causing bodily harm by wanton or furious driving.

Originally framed in the era of horse-drawn vehicles this legislation is now applied where offences involving motorised vehicles take place outside the provisions of the Road Traffic Act (on private land, when driving off-road or in pedestrianised areas) and in the small number of serious cases involving non-motorised collisions such as the few that involve cyclists and result in severe injury or loss of life, typically of pedestrians.

=== United States ===
The definition and penalties of vehicular manslaughter in the United States vary by state.

All states except Alaska, Montana, and Arizona have vehicular homicide statutes. The laws have the effect of making a vehicle a potentially deadly weapon, to allow for easier conviction and more severe penalties; in states without such statutes, defendants can still be charged with manslaughter or murder in some situations.

In the Model Penal Code, there is no distinction between vehicular homicide and vehicular homicides that involve negligence; instead, both are included in the overall category of negligent homicide.

==== California ====
In the state of California, depending on the degree of recklessness and whether alcohol was involved, a person could be charged with progressively more serious offenses: vehicular manslaughter, vehicular manslaughter while intoxicated, gross vehicular manslaughter while intoxicated, or second-degree murder. In any of these cases, the prosecution must prove that the driver committed some wrongful act (which could be a felony, a misdemeanor, an infraction, or a lawful act that might cause death) and that the wrongful act caused the collision and the death of the victim. Murder charges are usually reserved for the most egregious cases, such as a convicted DUI offender who drives recklessly while intoxicated and thereby causes a fatal collision.

==== Georgia ====
In the state of Georgia, vehicular homicide is more properly known as homicide by vehicle. It is defined, by statute, as the unlawful killing of another person using a vehicle. To be guilty of the offense, the perpetrator does not have to have an intent to kill, malice aforethought, or premeditation.

There are two degrees of vehicular homicide:

First degree homicide by vehicle
This is a felony that, upon conviction, will result in a sentence of between 3 and 15 years of imprisonment (or between 5 and 20 years for habitual violators), with no parole for at least 1 year. A homicide is first degree homicide by vehicle if the driver "unlawfully met or overtook a school bus; unlawfully failed to stop after a collision; was driving recklessly; was driving while under the influence of alcohol or drugs; failed to stop for, or otherwise was attempting to flee from, a law enforcement officer; or had previously been declared a habitual violator".
Second degree homicide by vehicle
This is a misdemeanor that, upon conviction, will result in a sentence of up to 1 year (which may be suspended), a fine of up to US$1,000, or both. Second degree homicide by vehicle encompasses all other homicides by vehicle, involving any other violation of the laws governing motor vehicles, that are not classed as first degree homicides.

==== Kentucky ====
In Kentucky, vehicular homicide is defined under KRS 507.060(1) as (a) causing the death of another and (b) "The death results from the person's operation of a motor vehicle, including but not limited to boats and airplanes, under the influence of alcohol, a controlled substance, or other substance which impairs driving ability as described in KRS 189A.010." Vehicular homicide is a Class B felony punishable by 10 to 20 years in prison and a fine of between $1,000 and $10,000.

In addition, KRS 532.036 allows courts to order individuals convicted of operating a motor vehicle under the influence of alcohol or drugs as defined KRS 189A.010 to pay financial support to the minor children of victims if the victim is killed or disabled. Financial support is permitted until the child is eighteen years old unless the child is enrolled in high school. In this case, financial support may be ordered until the child graduates from high school or turns nineteen years old.

==== Louisiana ====
In the state of Louisiana, vehicular homicide is defined as the killing of a human being while operating a motor vehicle, or other means of conveyance, under the influence of alcohol and/or controlled substances. The minimum punishment is a fine of at least $2,000 (not more than $15,000) and 5–30 years in prison.

The law is LSA RS 14:32.1.

==== Minnesota ====
In the state of Minnesota, vehicular homicide is one of the six levels of criminal vehicular operation, and is defined as causing the death of a person, that does not constitute murder or manslaughter, as a result of operating a motor vehicle in a grossly negligent manner, or in a negligent manner while in violation of the driving while intoxicated law, or where the driver flees the scene in violation of the felony fleeing law. Vehicular homicide in Minnesota requires, at a minimum, a mens rea of gross negligence.

==== Washington ====
Vehicular homicide in Washington state, is governed by RCW 46.61.520 Vehicular homicide—Penalty. as follow:

"(1) When the death of any person ensues within three years as a proximate result of injury proximately caused by the driving of any vehicle by any person, the driver is guilty of vehicular homicide if the driver was operating a motor vehicle:

a While under the influence of intoxicating liquor or any drug, as defined by RCW 46.61.502; or
b In a reckless manner; or
c With disregard for the safety of others.

(2) Vehicular homicide is a class A felony punishable under chapter 9A.20 RCW, except that, for a conviction under subsection (1)(a) of this section, an additional two years shall be added to the sentence for each prior offence as defined in RCW 46.61.5055."

==== Sentencing ====
A study by professors at Dartmouth College and Harvard University found that those convicted of vehicular homicide are given, on average, shorter sentences than those found guilty of other types of homicide. The study found that the gender of the offender does not statistically affect the length of the sentence, but the race does. The identity of the victim is a more important predictor of sentencing length, with longer sentences given to offenders in cases where the victim was female and/or had no violent criminal record.

Some states, such as Minnesota, have statutes allowing for a charge of a vehicular homicide if an unborn child is killed or injured by a motorist.

== See also ==
- Blunt trauma
- Moral luck
- Road rage
- Vehicular assault as a terrorist tactic
- Vehicular suicide
