= Highways Act 1773 =

Act of the Parliament of Great Britain

- Act of Parliament
- Parliament of Great Britain
- Long title: An Act to explain, amend, and reduce into One Act of Parliament, the Statutes now in being for the Amendment and Preservation of the Publick Highways within that Part of Great Britain called England; and for other Purposes.
- Citation: 13 Geo. 3. c. 78
- Territorial extent: Great Britain

Dates
- Royal assent: 1 July 1773
- Commencement: 21 September 1773 and 11 October 1773 (Note: Section 82.)
- Repealed: 1 January 1960
Other legislation
Repeals/revokes	Highways (No. 2) Act 1766
Amended by	Highways Act 1794; Highways (England) Act 1814; Highway Act 1835; Statute Law Revision Act 1958
Repealed by	Highways Act 1959
Relates to	Highways Act 1766; Turnpike Roads Act 1766; Highways (No. 2) Act 1766; Highways Act 1768; Turnpike Roads Act 1773

Status: Repealed

Text of statute as originally enacted

The Highways Act 1773 (13 Geo. 3. c. 78), also known as the General Highways Act 1773, was an act of the Parliament of Great Britain that consolidated all acts relating to highways in England and Wales.

== Background ==
The first legislated control in England was introduced under the Highways Act 1555 (2 & 3 Ph. & M. c. 8), which was amended and extended by the Highways Act 1562 (5 Eliz. 1. c. 13).

In 1663, the Road Repair (Hertfordshire, Cambridgeshire, and Huntingdonshire) Act 1663 (15 Cha. 2. c. 1) was passed to authorise the charging of rates for a section of the Great North Road in Hertfordshire, Bedfordshire and Huntingdonshire, becoming the first turnpike act. From the late 17th-century, Parliament increasingly took responsibility for repairing and maintaining roads from local authorities.

From 1700 to 1750, 143 new turnpike acts were passed, followed by a period of "turnpike mania", during which 375 new trusts were created between 1751 and 1772.

In response to the increased development and congestion of roads in England, the Highways Act 1766 (6 Geo. 3. c. 43), Highways (No. 2) Act 1766 (7 Geo. 3. c. 42), the Highways Act 1768 (8 Geo. 3. c. 5) and the Turnpike Roads Act 1766 (7 Geo. 3. c. 40) were passed to improve their regulation.

== Provisions ==
The act provided that horse riders, farmers, coachmen and lawless highwaymen must remain on the left side of the road.

Section 83 of the act repealed the Highways (No. 2) Act 1766 (7 Geo. 3. c. 42), effective on 11 October 1773, except for acts repealed not revived by the Highways Act 1768 (8 Geo. 3. c. 5).

== Subsequent developments ==
The Turnpike Roads Act 1773 (13 Geo. 3. c. 84) was passed at the same time as the act, which consolidated all acts relating to turnpike trusts in England and Wales.

The Select Committee on Temporary Laws described this act as a consolidation act.

In section 81 of the act, the words from " the defendant or defendants in every such action " to "have been so done, or", were repealed by section 3 of, and the third schedule to, the Statute Law Revision Act 1958 (6 & 7 Eliz. 2. c. 46), which came into force on 23 July 1958.

The whole act was repealed by section 312(2) of, and the twenty-fifth schedule to, the Highways Act 1959 (7 & 8 Eliz. 2. c. 25), which came into force on 1 January 1960.
