= Causing bodily harm by wanton or furious driving =

British vehicular assault misdemeanour

Causing bodily harm by wanton or furious driving is a statutory offence in England and Wales and Northern Ireland. It has been abolished in the Republic of Ireland.

== Statute ==
This offence is created by section 35 of the Offences against the Person Act 1861 (drivers of carriages injuring persons by furious driving):

"Whosoever, having the charge of any carriage or vehicle, shall by wanton or furious driving or racing, or other wilful misconduct, or by wilful neglect, do or cause to be done any bodily harm to any person whatsoever, shall be guilty of a misdemeanor, and being convicted thereof shall be liable, at the discretion of the court, to be imprisoned for any term not exceeding two years ..."

This section is printed as amended by section 1(2) of the Criminal Justice Act 1948 and of the Criminal Justice Act (Northern Ireland) 1953.

This section was repealed for the Republic of Ireland by section 70(a) of the Road Traffic Act 2010. In the Republic of Ireland, a person liable to be charged an offence under section 53 of the Road Traffic Act, 1961 was not liable, by reference to the same occurrence, to be charged with an offence under this section.

"Misdemeanour"

The reference to a misdemeanour must now be construed as a reference to an offence.

"Bodily harm"

See bodily harm

In England and Wales, this offence is now used to prosecute:

- drivers of horse-drawn carriages and vehicles
- motorists who cannot be prosecuted for dangerous driving because they were driving elsewhere than on a road or public place, or because they were not warned that prosecution was intended pursuant to section 1 of the Road Traffic Offenders Act 1988
- cyclists who cannot be prosecuted for dangerous cycling because they were cycling elsewhere than on a road, or because they were not warned that prosecution was intended pursuant to section 1 of the Road Traffic Offenders Act 1988

It was used in 2009 to prosecute a death caused by a cyclist collision, which would have fallen outside other laws as it is the closest equivalent to dangerous driving for cyclists. It was used again in 2017 for similar reasons.

== Mode of trial ==
In England and Wales, this is an indictable-only offence.

== Sentence ==
In England and Wales, this offence is punishable with imprisonment for any term not exceeding two years, as it is in Northern Ireland. In modern times, the offence has been used predominantly to charge cyclists that cause injury to pedestrians.

== Attempt ==
The offence of attempting to cause bodily harm by wanton driving requires an intent to cause bodily harm.

== See also ==
- United Kingdom traffic laws
