= Highway Act =

Stock short title used for legislation

Highway Act (with its variations) is a stock short title used in India, the United Kingdom and the United States for legislation relating to highways.

== India ==
- The National Highways Act, 1956

== United Kingdom ==
- The Highways Act 1555 (2 & 3 Ph. & M. c. 8)
  The Highways Act 1555 placed responsibility for the upkeep of public highways on the inhabitants of each parish, requiring the annual election of a surveyor of highways. It also required the inhabitants to work on four days nominated days a year repairing the roads ('statute labour')
- The Highways Act 1562 (5 Eliz. 1. c. 13)
  The Highways Act 1562 extended the statute labour requirement to six days per year, and empowered the surveyor to requisition stone, gravel and other materials for road repair without the landowner's consent.
- The Highways Act 1662 (14 Cha. 2. c. 6)
  The Highways Act 1662 regulated the duties of the parish surveyors, and – recognising that the previous acts had proved ineffective in practice – strengthened the penalties that could be applied to surveyors who neglected their duties, or by parishioners who did not provide the required statute labour.

Highways Act 1695
- Act of Parliament
- Parliament of England
- Long title: An Act for the better amending & repairing the High-ways and Explanacion of the Laws relateing thereunto.
- Citation: 7 & 8 Will. 3. c. 29
- Territorial extent: England and Wales

Dates
- Royal assent: 27 April 1696
- Commencement: 22 November 1695 (Note: Start of session.)
- Repealed: 21 September 1767
Other legislation
Amended by	Highways Act 1707
Repealed by	Highways (No. 2) Act 1766
Relates to	Bridges Act 1670; Highways Act 1696

Status: Repealed

Text of statute as originally enacted

- The Highways Act 1695 (7 & 8 Will. 3. c. 29)

Highways Act 1696
- Act of Parliament
- Parliament of England
- Long title: An Act for enlargeing Common High-ways.
- Citation: 8 & 9 Will. 3. c. 16
- Territorial extent: England and Wales

Dates
- Royal assent: 1 April 1697
- Commencement: 20 October 1696
- Repealed: 21 September 1767
Other legislation
Repealed by	Highways (No. 2) Act 1766
Relates to	Highways Act 1662; Highways Act 1695

Status: Repealed

Text of statute as originally enacted

- The Highways Act 1696 (8 & 9 Will. 3. c. 16)
  The Highways Act 1696 allowed land adjoining the highway to be taken for widening of the road, on payment of compensation (the amount to be assessed by a jury). This was a form of compulsory purchase power.

Highways Act 1707
- Act of Parliament
- Parliament of Great Britain
- Long title: An Act to repeal a Clause in an Act of the Seventh Year of the Reign of His late Majesty (for amending and repairing the Highways) which enjoins Waggoners and others to draw with a Pole between the Wheel Horses, or with Double Shafts; and to oblige them to draw only with Six Horses, or other Beasts, except up Hills.
- Citation: 6 Ann. c. 56 (Note: This is the citation in The Statutes of the Realm); 6 Ann. c. 29 (Note: This is the citation in The Statutes at Large)
- Territorial extent: Great Britain

Dates
- Royal assent: 1 April 1708
- Commencement: 23 October 1707 (Note: Start of session.)
- Repealed: 21 September 1767
Other legislation
Amends	Highways Act 1695
Amended by	Highways Act 1710
Repealed by	Highways (No. 2) Act 1766
Relates to	Highways Act 1714

Status: Repealed

Text of statute as originally enacted

- The Highways Act 1707 (6 Ann. c. 56)

Highways Act 1710
- Act of Parliament
- Parliament of Great Britain
- Long title: An Act to render more effectual an Act made in the Sixth Year of Her present Majesty, intituled, "An Act to repeal a Clause in an Act of the Seventh Year of the Reign of His late Majesty, for amending Highways, which enjoins Waggoners and others to draw with a Pole between the Wheel Horses, or with Double Shafts; and to oblige them to draw only with Six Horses, or other Beasts, except up Hills."
- Citation: 9 Ann. c. 23; 9 Ann. c. 18
- Territorial extent: Great Britain

Dates
- Royal assent: 16 May 1711
- Commencement: 24 January 1711 (Note: Section 1.)
- Repealed: 21 September 1767
Other legislation
Amends	Highways Act 1707
Repealed by	Highways (No. 2) Act 1766
Relates to	Highways Act 1714

Status: Repealed

Text of statute as originally enacted

- The Highways Act 1710 (9 Ann. c. 23)

Highways Act 1714
- Act of Parliament
- Parliament of Great Britain
- Long title: An Act to refrain all waggoners, carriers, and others, for drawing any carriage with more than five horses in length.
- Citation: 1 Geo. 1. St. 2. c. 11
- Territorial extent: Great Britain

Dates
- Royal assent: 2 August 1715
- Commencement: 30 September 1715
- Repealed: 21 September 1767
Other legislation
Amended by	Highways Act 1718
Repealed by	Highways (No. 2) Act 1766
Relates to	Highways Act 1707; Highways Act 1710

Status: Repealed

Text of statute as originally enacted

- The Highways Act 1714 (1 Geo. 1. St. 2. c. 11)
  The Highways Act 1714 restricted the drawing of vehicles by more than five horses in a line, to try to reduce highway damage. Exceptions were allowed for pulling wagons up steep hills.

Highways Act 1715
- Act of Parliament
- Parliament of Great Britain
- Long title: An Act for making the Laws for repairing the Highways more effectual.
- Citation: 1 Geo. 1. St. 2. c. 52
- Territorial extent: Great Britain

Dates
- Royal assent: 26 June 1716
- Commencement: 23 January 1728 (Note: Start of session.)
- Repealed: 21 September 1767
Other legislation
Amended by	Continuance, etc., of Acts, 1735
Repealed by	Highways (No. 2) Act 1766

Status: Repealed

Text of statute as originally enacted

- The Highways Act 1715 (1 Geo. 1. St. 2. c. 52)

Highways Act 1718
- Act of Parliament
- Parliament of Great Britain
- Long title: An Act for making more effectual the several Acts passed for repairing and amending the Highways of this Kingdom.
- Citation: 5 Geo. 1. c. 12
- Territorial extent: Great Britain

Dates
- Royal assent: 18 April 1719
- Commencement: 24 June 1719
- Repealed: 21 September 1767
Other legislation
Amends	Highways Act 1714
Amended by	Highways Act 1742; Highways and Turnpike Roads Act 1753
Repealed by	Highways (No. 2) Act 1766
Relates to	Highways Act 1741

Status: Repealed

Text of statute as originally enacted

- The Highways Act 1718 (5 Geo. 1. c. 12)
  The Highways Act 1718 allowed statute labour to be commuted into a monetary payment. This allowed parishes to hire labourers instead of relying on compelled unpaid work by local residents. The act also imposed rules on minimum wheel width and maximum cart weights, to try to reduce damage to roads.
- The Highway (Scotland) Act 1718 (5 Geo. 1. c. 30)
  The Highway (Scotland) Act 1718 retained existing pre-Union Scottish law on highways, bridges and ferries, whilst moving closer to the English system of highway maintenance by requiring parishioners to provide labour to maintain roads, and charging justices of the peace with providing oversight and imposing penalties.

Highways Act 1733
- Act of Parliament
- Parliament of Great Britain
- Long title: An Act to explain and make more effectual the Laws in being, to oblige the Possessors of Lands, adjacent to Common Highways, to cut and keep low such Hedges as are adjoining to the said Highways.
- Citation: 7 Geo. 2. c. 9
- Territorial extent: Great Britain

Dates
- Royal assent: 16 April 1734
- Commencement: 24 June 1734
- Repealed: 21 September 1767
Other legislation
Repealed by	Highways (No. 2) Act 1766

Status: Repealed

Text of statute as originally enacted

- The Highways Act 1733 (7 Geo. 2. c. 9)
  The Highways Act 1733 required owners of land alongside highways to cut back hedges, in order to improve sightlines for travellers. This was partly to prevent encroachment on the usable width of the road, but also to reduce the opportunity for highwaymen to conceal themselves.

Highways Act 1741
- Act of Parliament
- Parliament of Great Britain
- Long title: An Act to repeal so much of an Act passed in the last Session of Parliament, intituled, "An Act for the Preservation of the Public Roads in that Part of Great Britain called England," as obliges Persons not travelling for Hire, to make Use of Waggons with Wheels bound with Streaks, or Tyre, of a certain Breadth, or the said Streaks to be fastened with Nails of a certain Size.
- Citation: 15 Geo. 2. c. 2
- Territorial extent: Great Britain

Dates
- Royal assent: 3 February 1742
- Commencement: 10 February 1742
- Repealed: 21 September 1767
Other legislation
Amends	Preservation of Roads Act 1740
Repealed by	Highways (No. 2) Act 1766
Relates to	Highways Act 1718; Highways Act 1742

Status: Repealed

Text of statute as originally enacted

- The Highways Act 1741 (15 Geo. 2. c. 2)
  The Highways Act 1741 removed the restrictions on wheel width, iron treads and prescribed nails from private individuals using their waggons for their own purposes (for example farms). The restrictions still applied to commercial carriers.

Highways Act 1742
- Act of Parliament
- Parliament of Great Britain
- Long title: An Act for allowing Carts to be drawn with four Horses.
- Citation: 16 Geo. 2. c. 29
- Territorial extent: Great Britain

Dates
- Royal assent: 21 April 1743
- Commencement: 25 April 1743
- Repealed: 21 September 1767
Other legislation
Amends	Highways Act 1718; Preservation of Roads Act 1740
Repealed by	Highways (No. 2) Act 1766
Relates to	Highways Act 1741

Status: Repealed

Text of statute as originally enacted

- The Highways Act 1742 (16 Geo. 2. c. 29)
  The Highways Act 1742 relaxed the restrictions on the number of horses allowed in some urban areas (such as London), allowing at least four horses to be used anywhere in the country.

Highways Act 1747
- Act of Parliament
- Parliament of Great Britain
- Long title: An Act to explain and amend an Act passed in the Fourteenth Year of His Majesty's Reign, intituled, "An Act for the Preservation of the Public Roads, in that Part of Great Britain called England," and so much of an Act passed in the Third Year of the Reign of King William and Queen Mary, intituled, "An Act for the better repairing and amending the Highways, and for settling the Rates of the Carriage of Goods," as relates to the settling the Rates of the Carriage of Goods.
- Citation: 21 Geo. 2. c. 28
- Territorial extent: Great Britain

Dates
- Royal assent: 13 May 1748
- Commencement: 10 November 1747
- Repealed: 21 June 1827
Other legislation
Amends	Highways, etc. Act 1691; Preservation of Roads Act 1740
Amended by	Turnpike Roads Act 1766; Advances for Rebuilding London Bridge Act 1826
Repealed by	Rates of Carriage of Goods Act 1827

Status: Repealed

Text of statute as originally enacted

- The Highways Act 1747 (21 Geo. 2. c. 28)
  The Highways Act 1747 amended and reinforced earlier rules on wagon wheels and maximum cart weights, and increased penalties for non-compliant vehicles.

Highways Act 1753
- Act of Parliament
- Parliament of Great Britain
- Long title: An act for the preventing of the inconveniences and dangers that may arise from the present methods of digging gravel, sandy stone, chalk, and other materials, on the several commons and waste grounds within this kingdom, for the repair of the highways, and for other purposes.
- Citation: 26 Geo. 2. c. 28
- Territorial extent: Great Britain

Dates
- Royal assent: 7 June 1753
- Commencement: 24 June 1753
- Repealed: 21 September 1767
Other legislation
Repealed by	Highways (No. 2) Act 1766

Status: Repealed

Text of statute as originally enacted

- The Highways Act 1753 (26 Geo. 2. c. 28)
  Parish surveyors had long been empowered to dig materials for highway repair, but there was increasing concern about dangerous pits and excavations. The Highways Act 1753 required that pits were filled in, or securely fenced to prevent accidents.

Highways Act 1765
- Act of Parliament
- Parliament of Great Britain
- Long title: An Act to continue Part of an Act made in the Thirtieth Year of the Reign of His late Majesty King George the Second, intituled, "An Act to render more effectual the several Laws now in being, for the Amendment and Preservation of the Publick Highways and Turnpike Roads of this Kingdom," and for making further Provision for the Preservation of the said Roads.
- Citation: 5 Geo. 3. c. 38
- Territorial extent: Great Britain

Dates
- Royal assent: 25 May 1765
- Commencement: 24 June 1765
- Expired: 24 June 1772 (Note: Section 1. 7 years.)
- Repealed: 29 September 1767
Other legislation
Amends	Highways and Turnpike Roads (No. 2) Act 1757
Amended by	Highways Act 1766
Repealed by	Turnpike Roads Act 1766

Status: Repealed

Text of statute as originally enacted

- The Highways Act 1765 (5 Geo. 3. c. 38)

Highways Act 1766
- Act of Parliament
- Parliament of Great Britain
- Long title: An Act for explaining, amending, and further enforcing, the Execution or Two several Acts; one made in the Twenty-sixth Year of His late Majesty; and the other, in the Fifth Year of His present Majesty's Reign, for the Amendment and Preservation of the public Highways and Turnpike Roads of this Kingdom; and for obliging Mortgagees taking Possession of Toll-gates on Turnpike Roads, and Toll, gatherers appointed by them, to accompt.
- Citation: 6 Geo. 3. c. 43
- Territorial extent: Great Britain

Dates
- Royal assent: 6 June 1766
- Commencement: 5 July 1766
- Repealed: 29 September 1767
Other legislation
Amends	Highways and Turnpike Roads (No. 2) Act 1757; Highways Act 1765
Repeals/revokes	Highways Act 1707; Highways Act 1710; Highways Act 1733
Repealed by	Turnpike Roads Act 1766

Status: Repealed

Text of statute as originally enacted

- The Highways Act 1766 (6 Geo. 3. c. 43)
- The Highways (No. 2) Act 1766 (7 Geo. 3. c. 42)
  The Highways (No. 2) Act 1766 consolidated and replaced all earlier national highways legislation in England and Wales.

Highways Act 1768
- Act of Parliament
- Parliament of Great Britain
- Long title: An Act to explain, amend, and render more effectual, an Act passed in the Seventh Year of His present Majesty's Reign, intituled, "An Act to explain, amend, and reduce into One Act of Parliament, the several Statutes now in being, for the amendment, and Preservation of the Public Highways of this Kingdom; and for other Purposes therein mentioned."
- Citation: 8 Geo. 3. c. 5
- Territorial extent: Great Britain

Dates
- Royal assent: 21 December 1767
- Commencement: 24 November 1767
- Repealed: 15 July 1867
Other legislation
Amends	Weald of Kent Highways (Diversion) Act 1523; Sussex Highway (Diversion) Act 1534; Highways (No. 2) Act 1766
Repealed by	Statute Law Revision Act 1867

Status: Repealed

Text of statute as originally enacted

- The Highways Act 1768 (8 Geo. 3. c. 5)
  The Highways Act 1768 reinforced rules on wagon wheels, requiring them to be at least 2.5 inches (6.4 cm) wide to reducing cutting into the road surface and rutting. The act also increased penalties for failing to provide statute labour, gave additional powers to the parish surveyors of highways.
- The Highways Act 1773 (13 Geo. 3. c. 78)

Highway Act 1794
- Act of Parliament
- Parliament of Great Britain
- Long title: An Act for the more effectually repairing of such Parts of the Highways of this Kingdom as are to be repaired by two Parishes.
- Citation: 34 Geo. 3. c. 64
- Territorial extent: Great Britain

Dates
- Royal assent: 23 May 1794
- Commencement: 23 May 1794 (Note: The Acts of Parliament (Commencement) Act 1793.)
- Repealed: 20 March 1836
Other legislation
Repealed by	Highway Act 1835

Status: Repealed

Text of statute as originally enacted

- The Highway Act 1794 (34 Geo. 3. c. 64)
  The Highways Act 1794 strengthened the duties of surveyors of highways, and clarified the obligation of landowners to contribute statute labour towards the maintenance of highways within their parish, alongside tougher penalties for parishes that neglected the repair of roads.

Highways Act 1794
- Act of Parliament
- Parliament of Great Britain
- Long title: An Act for varying some of the Provisions in an Act of the thirteenth Year of His present Majesty's Reign, respecting the Public Highways within that Part of Great Britain called England, which relate to the Performance of Statute Duty.
- Citation: 34 Geo. 3. c. 74
- Territorial extent: Great Britain

Dates
- Royal assent: 11 June 1794
- Commencement: 29 September 1794
- Repealed: 20 March 1836
Other legislation
Amends	Highways Act 1773
Repealed by	Highway Act 1835

Status: Repealed

Text of statute as originally enacted

- The Highways Act 1794 (34 Geo. 3. c. 74)
  The Highways Act 1794 improved the system of surveyors of highways by appointing professional, paid surveyors to replace unpaid parish officers. It also moved from maintenance by unpaid local labour ('statute labour') to paid highway rates to fund the upkeep of parish roads. This act reinforced the traditional system, as a step towards an further changes the next month, modernising and the system.
- The Highway Act 1835 (5 & 6 Will. 4. c. 50)
- The Highway (Railway Crossings) Act 1839 (2 & 3 Vict. c. 45)
  The Highway (Railway Crossings) Act 1839 required railway companies to maintain gates at every point a public highway crossed a railway, and to employ gatekeepers to open and shut the gates. The act clarified that level crossing maintained and operation were responsibilities of the railway companies and not the parish or turnpike authorities.
- The Highway Act 1862 (25 & 26 Vict. c. 61)
  The Highway Act 1862 started the move away from the ancient parish-based system of road maintenance by allowing the creation of highway districts. Highway districts grouped parishes together; within a highway district the highway board (composed of representatives from the constituent parish vestries) levied a highway rate and managed the maintenance of the roads. The act didn't apply to urban areas where road maintenance sat with improvement commissioners or local boards.
- The Highway Act 1863 (26 & 27 Vict. c. 61)
  The Highway Act 1863 clarified the powers and procedures of the new highway boards, such as how and where they met, and how they should conduct their business. It also clarified the authority of the boards to levy and spend the highway rate, and provided clarity on the transference of responsibility from the existing parish surveyors to highway boards when they were created.
- The Highway Act 1864 (27 & 28 Vict. c. 101)
  The Highway Act 1864 strengthened transparency and accountability measures for the new highway boards, and strengthened the framework for grouping parishes into highway districts.
- The Highways and Locomotives (Amendment) Act 1878 (41 & 42 Vict. c. 77)
  The Highways and Locomotives (Amendment) Act 1878 required highway districts to align to rural sanitary districts, with the rural sanitary authority taking over the responsibilities of the highway boards. It also created a concept of 'main roads' – former turnpike roads which were to have half their maintenance costs paid for by a county-wide rate.
- The Highway Rate Assessment and Expenditure Act 1882 (45 & 46 Vict. c. 27)
  The Highway Rate Assessment and Expenditure Act 1882 aligned processes for administration of the highway rate with those for the poor rate.
- The Highway Act Amendment Act 1885 (48 & 49 Vict. c. 13)
  The Highway Act Amendment Act 1885 made a number of minor amendments to earlier acts to adjust the power of highway boards, and amend rules on the administration of highway rates.
- The Special Roads Act 1949 (12, 13 & 14 Geo. 6. c. 32)
  The Special Roads Act 1949 allowed the construction of 'special roads', roads which were restricted to only particular types of traffic, in contrast to the all-purpose public highways that already existed. This was used to introduce motorways.
- The Highways Act 1959 (7 & 8 Eliz. 2. c. 25)
  The Highways Act 1959 was another consolidating act, consolidating and rationalising a large number of highway related laws passed since the 18th century.
- The Highways (Miscellaneous Provisions) Act 1961 (9 & 10 Eliz. 2. c. 63)
  Made highway authorities legally liable for damage caused by poorly repaired roads. Introduced provisions for dealing with encroachments onto the highway.
- The Highways (Amendment) Act 1965 (c. 30)
  The Highways (Amendment) Act 1965 reinforced the duty of highway authorities to remove obstructions from the public highway, making it clear that this included natural obstructions such as snow and landslips.
- The Highways Act 1971 (c. 41)
  The Highways Act 1971 introduced a number of new areas of highway law: rules on creation of access to premises adjoining the highway, regulation of builders' skips, provision of lay-bys, public conveniences and lorry parks by highway authorities, strengthening of public rights of way law, and provisions relating to the maintenance of bridges.
- The Highways Act 1980 (c. 66)

Highways (Amendment) Act 1986 (Note: Section 2(1).)}
- Act of Parliament
- Parliament of the United Kingdom
- Long title: An Act to amend the Highways Act 1980 so as to impose penalties in cases where a user of a highway is injured, interrupted or endangered in consequence of the lighting of a fire on the highway or elsewhere.
- Citation: 1986 c. 13
- Territorial extent: England and Wales (Note: Section 2(4).)

Dates
- Royal assent: 2 May 1986
- Commencement: 2 July 1986 (Note: Section 2(2).)
Other legislation
Amends	Highways Act 1980

Status: Current legislation

Text of statute as originally enacted

Revised text of statute as amended

Text of the Highways (Amendment) Act 1986 as in force today (including any amendments) within the United Kingdom, from legislation.gov.uk.

- The Highways (Amendment) Act 1986 (c. 13)
  The Highways (Amendment) Act 1986 strengthened the section 161 Highways Act 1980 prohibition on lighting fires or discharging firearms within 50 feet of a highway by introducing stricter penalties if any highway user was injured or endangered by a fire, discharge of firearm, or setting off of a firework.
- The Highways (Obstruction by Body Corporate) Act 2004 (c. 29)
  The Highways (Obstruction by Body Corporate) Act 2004 allowed the enforcement of obstruction of the highway to be enforced personally against the officers (directors, managers, etc.) of a corporate body (such as a limited company), and not merely the company. This was necessary to deal with issues of obstruction by builders' skips and scaffolding.

The Highway Acts 1835 to 1885 was the collective title of the following acts:

- The Highway Act 1835
- The Highway Act 1862
- The Highway Act 1863
- The Highway Act 1864
- The Highways and Locomotives (Amendment) Act 1878
- The Highway Rate Assessment and Expenditure Act 1882
- The Highway Act Amendment Act 1885

== United States ==
- Federal Aid Highway Act of 1956
- Federal Aid Highway Act of 1973
- Federal-Aid Highway Act (disambiguation page)
- National Highway System Designation Act of 1995

== See also ==
- List of short titles
