= Bridges Act 1670 =

Act of the Parliament of England

Bridges Act 1670 (Note: The citation of this act by this short title was authorised by section 5 of, and the second schedule to, the Statute Law Revision Act 1948. Due to the repeal of those provisions, it is now authorised by section 19(2) of the Interpretation Act 1978.)
- Act of Parliament
- Parliament of England
- Long title: An Additionall Act for the better repairing of Highwayes and Bridges. (Note: These words are printed against this act in the second column of the second schedule to the Statute Law Revision Act 1948, which is headed "Title".)
- Citation: 22 Cha. 2. c. 12
- Territorial extent: England and Wales

Dates
- Royal assent: 11 April 1670
- Commencement: 14 February 1670 (Note: Start of session.)
- Repealed: 18 July 1973
Other legislation
Amended by	Highways (No. 2) Act 1766; Statute Law Revision Act 1863
Repealed by	Statute Law (Repeals) Act 1973
Relates to	Highways Act 1695

Status: Repealed

Text of statute as originally enacted

The Bridges Act 1670 (22 Cha. 2. c. 12) was an act of the Parliament of England.

== Subsequent developments ==
The whole act, except section 2 and as relates to Bridges over Rivers in the Counties of Chester, Lancaster, and Monmouth, was repealed by section 1 of, and the schedule to, the Statute Law Revision Act 1863 (26 & 27 Vict. c. 125), which came into force on 28 July 1863.

The whole act was repealed by section 1(1) of, and part VI of schedule 1 to, the Statute Law (Repeals) Act 1973, which came into force on 18 July 1973.

== See also ==
- Bridges Act
