= Causing death by dangerous driving =

Statutory offence in the UK

Causing death by dangerous driving is a statutory offence in England and Wales, Scotland and Northern Ireland, as well as Hong Kong. It is an aggravated form of dangerous driving. In the UK, it was created by section 1 of the Road Traffic Act 1988 (as substituted by the Road Traffic Act of 1991), and in Hong Kong it was created by section 36 of the Road Traffic Ordinance.

== Statute ==
=== United Kingdom ===
Section 1 of the Road Traffic Act 1988 (as substituted by section 1 of the Road Traffic Act 1991), creates the offences of causing death by dangerous driving:

A person who causes the death of another person by driving a mechanically propelled vehicle dangerously on a road or other public place is guilty of an offence.

==== "Dangerously" ====
A person is to be regarded as driving dangerously for sections 1 and 2 of the Road Traffic Act 1988 if

- the way he/she drives falls far below what would be expected of a competent and careful driver, and it would be obvious to a competent and careful driver that driving in that way would be dangerous; or
- if it would be obvious to a competent and careful driver that driving the vehicle in its current state (for the determination of which regard may be had to anything attached to or carried on or in it, and to the manner in which it is attached or carried) would be dangerous.

In this context, "dangerous" refers to danger either of injury to any person or of serious property damage; and in determining what would be expected of, or obvious to, a competent and careful driver in a particular case, regard shall be had not only to the circumstances of which he could be expected to be aware but also to any circumstances shown to have been within the knowledge of the accused.

In Attorney General's Reference (No 4 of 2000) (2001) 2 Cr. App. R. 417 Woolf CJ said at p 422:

The essential limbs, as is common ground, do not require any specific intent to drive dangerously. Section 2A sets out a wholly objective test. The concept of what is obvious to a careful driver places the question of what constitutes dangerous driving within the province of the jury.

Thus, whereas the underlying test of dangerousness is objective, a test based on the concept of "obviousness" considers the extent of knowledge as to causation. This test is hybrid, drawing both on the actual subjective knowledge that the accused had in his or her mind at the time the actus reus of driving occurred, and on the knowledge that would have been in the mind of a reasonable person (see mens rea and criminal negligence for discussion on the nature of these tests and the scope of the reasonable person).

The Court of Appeal held in the case of R v Bannister that police drivers get no special treatment. "The special skill (or indeed lack of skill) of a driver is an irrelevant circumstance when considering whether the driving is dangerous".

=== Hong Kong ===
Section 36(1) of the Road Traffic Ordinance (Cap. 374) creates the offence of causing death by dangerous driving, which is very similar to its British counterpart:

A person who causes the death of another person by driving a motor vehicle on a road dangerously commits an offence.

According to sections 36(4–6) of the same law,

(4) A person is to be regarded as driving dangerously within the meaning of subsection (1) if—

(a) the way he drives falls far below what would be expected of a competent and careful driver; and

(b) it would be obvious to a competent and careful driver that driving in that way would be dangerous.

(5) A person is also to be regarded as driving dangerously within the meaning of subsection (1) if it would be obvious to a competent and careful driver that driving the motor vehicle concerned in its current state would be dangerous.

(6) For the purposes of subsections (4) and (5), dangerous refers to danger either of injury to any person or of serious damage to property.

== Mode of trial ==
Causing death by dangerous driving is an indictable-only offence.

== Sentencing ==
=== United Kingdom ===
A person convicted of causing death by dangerous driving is liable to imprisonment for up to 14 years and a driving ban of at least 2 years for an offence committed before 28 June 2022. The Police, Crime, Sentencing and Courts Act 2022 increased the penalties greatly, with the maximum sentence changed to life imprisonment and the period of disqualification changed to 5 years at the minimum for offences committed on or after this date. Endorsement is obligatory on conviction. The offence carries three to eleven penalty points (when the defendant is exceptionally not disqualified).

The Court of Appeal in R v Cooksley and others gave guidelines for cases where death is caused by dangerous driving. In R v Richardson the Court of Appeal reassessed the starting point set out in R v Cooksley taking into consideration the increase in the maximum penalty. The relevant starting points identified in Cooksley should be reassessed as follows:

i) No aggravating circumstances – twelve months to two years' imprisonment (previously 18 months);
ii) Intermediate culpability – two to four-and-a-half years' imprisonment (previously 3 years);
iii) Higher culpability – four-and-a-half to seven years' imprisonment (previously 5 years);
iv) Most serious culpability – seven to fourteen years' imprisonment (previous starting point of 6 years).

When a court disqualifies a person on conviction for causing death by dangerous driving, it must order an extended retest.

==== History ====
Part I of Schedule 2 to the Road Traffic Offenders Act 1988 originally provided that a person convicted of this offence was liable to imprisonment for a term not exceeding five years. It was amended by section 67(1) of the Criminal Justice Act 1993 on 16 August 1993 so as to increase the maximum term to ten years.

=== Hong Kong ===
A person convicted on indictment of causing death by dangerous driving is liable to a fine of 50000 HKD (about £5152) and to imprisonment for 10 years, as well as mandatory disqualification from driving for at least 5 years without special circumstances.

== New offences ==
The Road Safety Act 2006 introduced two new offences, of "causing death by careless, or inconsiderate driving" and a distinct offence for causing (any) death by driving when unlicensed, disqualified or uninsured. Causing death by driving while disqualified was split off as a separate offence by the Criminal Justice and Courts Act 2015 with a much higher maximum sentence.

== History ==
This offence was formerly created by the Road Traffic Act 1956. It was introduced as an alternative to manslaughter as juries had been found reluctant to convict defendants of that offence.

== Equivalents in other countries ==
=== Australia (not including overseas dependencies) ===
In New South Wales and Western Australia, "Dangerous driving occasioning death" is an equivalent to "Causing death by dangerous driving".

The person's driving privileges, in Western Australia, will be suspended for at least 2 years, from the date of conviction. Should any of the following "Circumstances of aggravation" be proven, in a trial for dangerous driving occasioning death, it is possible for the driver to receive a prison sentence of up to and including 20 years:

- driver was unlawfully driving the motor vehicle concerned without the consent of the owner or person in charge (an equivalent to aggravated TWOC);
- driver was driving more than 45 km/h (28 mph) over the speed limit; or
- person was driving the vehicle to escape pursuit by the police

If a defendant is tried in District Court for dangerous driving occasioning death, but none of the circumstances of aggravation can be proven, the maximum imprisonment is 10 years. A conviction in Magistrates Court can result in imprisonment of up to and including 3 years.

In NSW, the maximum term of imprisonment, for a conviction of dangerous driving occasioning death, is:

- 14 years, if:
  - the person's blood alcohol content was 0.15 or more;
  - the person drove the vehicle at 45 or more km/h over the posted speed limit;
  - the person drove the vehicle to escape the police; or
  - the person drove under the influence of drugs or a combination of drink and drugs
- 10 years, if none of the above circumstances of aggravation was present at the time of the offence

The equivalent, in Queensland, to "Causing death by dangerous driving", is "Dangerous operation of a vehicle causing death". Under Section 328A of the Queensland Criminal Code, the maximum penalties, for this offence, are:

- 14 years, if the driver:
  - operated the vehicle at more than 40 km/h (25 mph) over the posted speed limit
  - was under the influence of drink or drugs
  - knew or ought to have known, that bodily harm or death resulted, and the death of the victim so results, but nonetheless failed to remain at the scene of the collision, "other than to obtain medical or other help for the other person, before a police officer arrives"
- 10 years, if none of the above circumstances of aggravation is present

Driving disqualifications handed down by Australian courts, whether inside or outside Queensland, will result in the suspension of Queensland driving privileges. Disqualifications for dangerous operation of a vehicle causing death are included.

=== Canada ===
In Canada, the Criminal Code has several road traffic offences equivalent to causing death by dangerous driving. The basic offence, "Dangerous operation of a motor vehicle causing death", has a maximum penalty of 14 years' imprisonment. If the driver is convicted of failing to stop for police, criminal negligence, street racing, a hit and run or drunk-driving, in addition to dangerous driving, and a death resulted, the maximum penalty is life imprisonment.

A person's Canada-wide driving privileges will be suspended, for any Criminal Code driving conviction, although lengths of suspensions vary by province and territory. In some cases, a driver's licence can be taken away permanently after a certain number of Criminal Code driving convictions, as in the province of Ontario.

Some provinces and American states have agreements to mutually recognize road traffic offences that occur out-of-province or out-of-state. Traffic violations that occur in Michigan and New York for vehicular homicide are counted, for licence suspension purposes, on a person's Ontario driving record. Vehicular homicide convictions in Maine and New York are counted on a driver's Quebec driving record (see also "United States" above).

=== Ireland (Republic) ===
An equivalent, under Republic of Ireland traffic laws, to causing death by dangerous driving, is "Dangerous driving causing death". The maximum period of imprisonment, for such a conviction, is 10 years. The minimum licence suspension is 5 years. The UK and Republic of Ireland are parties to the 1998 EU Convention on Driving Disqualifications (98/C 216/01) and therefore convictions for dangerous driving causing death in the UK are counted on a person's Republic of Ireland driving record.

=== United States (not including overseas dependencies) ===
In many American states, vehicular homicide is an equivalent to causing death by dangerous driving. Maximum prison sentences and licence suspension lengths vary by state.

Vehicular homicide, under the Commercial Motor Vehicle Safety Act of 1986, is often classified as a "major violation", with the following minimum CDL suspensions applicable country-wide:

- for a 1st conviction: 3-year suspension from operating commercial motor vehicles designed to transport hazardous materials; otherwise, 1 year
- for a 2nd conviction: lifetime, although 10 years if a state allows CDL privileges to be reinstated

Some states, such as Florida and Virginia, count out-of-state traffic violations, so long as they occurred anywhere else in the United States, the same as traffic violations that occurred in the state in which the driver was licensed. Vehicular homicide convictions are included.

Other states, such as New York and Maine, count some traffic violations that occur in Canada, the same as if those violations had occurred in those states. Vehicular homicide convictions are included. Permanent revocation of driving privileges is possible, particularly for holders of driving licences issued in North Carolina or New York, after a vehicular homicide conviction.

== See also ==
- United Kingdom traffic laws
- Sleep-deprived driving, an aggravating factor in dangerous driving cases

== See also ==
- Aggravated TWOC
- Vehicular homicide – a proposed replacement for causing death by dangerous driving, advocated by some legal reformists
