= Highways (No. 2) Act 1766 =

Act of the Parliament of Great Britain

- Act of Parliament
- Parliament of Great Britain
- Long title: An Act to explain, amend, and reduce into one Act of Parliament, the several Statutes now in Being, for the Amendment and Preservation of the publick Highways of this Kingdom; and for other Purposes therein mentioned.
- Citation: 7 Geo. 3. c. 42
- Introduced by: Thomas Gilbert MP (Commons)
- Territorial extent: Great Britain

Dates
- Royal assent: 29 June 1767
- Commencement: 21 September 1767 (Note: Section 56.)
- Repealed: 21 September 1773
Other legislation
Amends	See § Repealed enactments
Repeals/revokes	See § Repealed enactments
Amended by	Highways Act 1768; Hackney Coaches Act 1792
Repealed by	Highways Act 1773
Relates to	Highways Act 1766; Turnpike Roads Act 1766; Highways Act 1768; Highways Act 1773; Turnpike Roads Act 1773

Status: Repealed

Text of statute as originally enacted

The Highways (No. 2) Act 1766 (7 Geo. 3. c. 42), was an act of the Parliament of Great Britain that consolidated all acts relating to highways in England and Wales.

== Background ==
The first legislated control in England was introduced under the Highways Act 1555 (2 & 3 Ph. & M. c. 8), which was amended and extended by the Highways Act 1562 (5 Eliz. 1. c. 13).

In 1663, the Road Repair (Hertfordshire, Cambridgeshire, and Huntingdonshire) Act 1663 (15 Cha. 2. c. 1) was passed to authorise the charging of rates for a section of the Great North Road in Hertfordshire, Bedfordshire and Huntingdonshire, becoming the first turnpike act. From the late 17th-century, Parliament increasingly took responsibility for repairing and maintaining roads from local authorities.

From 1700 to 1750, 143 new turnpike acts were passed, followed by a period of "turnpike mania", during which 375 new trusts were created between 1751 and 1772.

In response to the increased development and congestion of roads in England, the Highways Act 1766 (6 Geo. 3. c. 43) was passed to improve their regulation.

== Provisions ==
=== Repealed enactments ===
Section 57 of the act repealed 24 enactments, listed in that section.

Citation	Short title	Description	Extent of repeal
13 Edw. 1. Stat. 2. c. 5	Breadth of Highways leading from one Market-Town to another	An act passed in the thirteenth year of the reign of King Edward the First, ascertaining the breadth of highways leading from one market town to another.	The whole act.
14 & 15 Hen. 8. c. 6	Weald of Kent Highways (Diversion) Act 1523	An act passed in the fourteenth and fifteenth of King Henry the Eighth, for alteration of highways in the Weld of Kent.	The whole act. (Note: This act was revived by section 3 of the Highways Act 1768 (8 Geo. 3. c. 5) and was wholly repealed by section 1 of, and the first schedule to, the Statute Law Revision Act 1948 (11 & 12 Geo. 6. c. 62).)
26 Hen. 8. c. 7	Sussex Highway (Diversion) Act 1534	An act or bill passed in the twenty sixth of King Henry the Eighth, intituled, The bill for the highways in the county of Sussex.	The whole act.
2 & 3 Phil. & Mary. c. 8	Highways Act 1555	An act passed in the second and third of King Philip and Queen Mary, intituled, The statute for the mending of highways.	The whole act.
5 Eliz. c. 13	Highways Act 1562	An act passed in the fifth of Queen Elizabeth, intituled, An act for the continuance of the statute made in the time of King Philip and Mary, for the amendment of highways.	The whole act.
18 Eliz.	Highways Act 1575	An act passed in the eighteenth of Queen Elizabeth, intituled, An act of addition unto the former acts for amending and repairing of highways.	The whole act.
27 Eliz.	Isle of Sheppey (Roads) Act 1584	An act passed in the twenty seventh of Queen Elizabeth, intituled, An act for explaining of the statute for the amending of the highways between Middleton and the King's Ferry leading into the isle of Sheppey in the county of Kent.	The whole act.
39 Eliz. c. 19	Highways Act 1597	An act passed in the thirty ninth of Queen Elizabeth, intituled, An act for the amendment of highways in Sussex, Surry, and Kent.	The whole act.
22 Car. 2.	Bridges Act 1670	An act passed in the twenty second of King Charles the Second, (intituled, An additional act for the better repairing of highways and bridges).	As relates to the highways.
2 Will. & Mary, c. 8	London Streets, etc. Act 1690	An act passed in the second of King William and Queen Mary (intituled, An act for paving and cleansing the streets in the cities of London and Westminster, and suburbs and liberties thereof, and out-parishes in the county of Middlesex and in the borough of Southwark, and other places within the weekly bills of mortality in the county of Surry, and for regulating the markets therein mentioned).	As relates to the power therein given to make assessments for the purpose of repairing the highways.
3 Will. & Mary, c.	Highways, etc. Act 1691	An act passed in the third year of King William and Queen Mary, (intituled, An act for the better repairing and amending the highways, and for settling the rates of carriage of goods).	As relates to the highways.
7 & 8 Will. 3	Highways Act 1695	An act passed in the seventh and eighth of King William the Third, intituled, An act for the better amending and repairing the highways, and explanation of the laws relating thereunto.	The whole act.
8 & 9 Will. 3	Highways Act 1696	An act passed in the eighth and ninth of King William the Third, intituled, An act for enlarging common highways.	The whole act.
6 Anne. c. 56	Highways Act 1707	An act passed in the sixth of Queen Anne, intituled, An act to repeal a clause in an act of the seventh year of the reign of his late Majesty, for amending and repairing the highways; which enjoins waggoners and others to draw with a pole between the wheel horses, or with double shafts, and to oblige them to draw only with fix horses or other beasts, except up hills.	The whole act.
9 Anne. c. 23	Highways Act 1710	An act of the ninth of Queen Anne, intituled, An act to explain part of an act made in the sixth year of her present Majesty, intituled, An act to repeal a clause in an act made in the seventh year of the reign of his late Majesty for amending highways, which enjoins waggoners and others to draw with a pole between the wheel horses, or with double shafts, and to oblige them to draw only with fix horses or other beasts, except up hills	The whole act.
1 Geo. 1. St. 2. c. 11	Highways Act 1714	An act passed in the first year of King George the First, intituled, An act to restrain all waggoners, carriers, and others, from drawing any carriage with more than five horses in length.	The whole act.
1 Geo. 1. St. 2. c. 52	Highways Act 1715	Another act passed in the first year of King George the First, intituled, An act for making more effectual the several acts passed for repairing and amending the highways of this kingdom.	The whole act.
7 Geo. 2. c. 9	Highways Act 1733	An act passed in the seventh year of his late majesty King George the Second, intituled, An act to explain and make more effectual the laws in being to oblige the possessors of lands adjacent to common highways, to cut and keep their hedges low, and trees pruned, adjoining to the said highways.	The whole act.
9 Geo. 2. c. 18	Continuance, etc., of Acts, 1735	An act passed in the ninth year of the reign of his late majesty King George the Second, intituled, An act for reviving and confirming the acts therein mentioned, and for explaining and amending a clause in an act made in the first year of the reign of his late majesty King George the First, intituled, An act for making the laws for repairing the highways more effectual; relating to the appointing scavengers in cities and market towns; and the ordering the assessment for the repairing and cleansing the streets therein.	As extends the statute in the said act, made in the first year of King George the First, unto market towns.
14 Geo. 2. c. 42	Preservation of Roads Act 1740	An act passed in the fourteenth year of King George the Second, intituled, An act for the preservation of the publick roads in Great Britain called England.	As relates to the highways of this kingdom, not being turnpike roads.
15 Geo. 2. c. 2	Highways Act 1741	An act passed in the fifteenth of King George the Second, intituled, An act to repeal so much of an act passed in the last sessions of parliament, intituled, An act for the preservation of the publick roads in that part of Great Britain called England..	As obliges persons, not travelling for hire, to make use of waggons with wheels bound with streaks or tire of a certain breadth, or the said streaks to be fastened with nails of a certain size.
16 Geo. 2.	Highways Act 1742	An act passed in the sixteenth year of King George the Second, intituled, An act for allowing carts to be drawn with four horses.	The whole act.
26 Geo. 2. c. 28	Highways Act 1753	An act passed in the twenty sixth year of King George the Second, intituled, An act for the preventing of the inconveniences and dangers that may arise from the present methods of digging gravel, sand, stone, chalk, and other materials, on the several commons and waste grounds within the kingdom, for the repair of the highways, and for other purposes.	The whole act.
30 Geo. 2.	Traffic on Highways Act 1757	An act passed in the thirtieth year of the reign of his late majesty King George the Second, intituled, An act to explain and amend an act made in the eighteenth year of his present Majesty's reign, to prevent the misbehaviour of the drivers of carts in the streets in London, Westminster, and the limits of the weekly bills of mortality, and for other purposes in this act mentioned.	As relates to the publick streets or common highways of this kingdom, not being within the cities of London or Westminster, or within the limits of the weekly bills of mortality.

== Subsequent developments ==
The Turnpike Roads Act 1766 (7 Geo. 3. c. 40) was passed at the same time as the act, which consolidated all acts relating to turnpike trusts in England and Wales.

The Weald of Kent Highways (Diversion) Act 1523 (14 & 15 Hen. 8. c. 6) and the Sussex Highway (Diversion) Act 1534 (26 Hen. 8. c. 7) were revived by section 3 of the Highways Act 1768 (8 Geo. 3. c. 5), which further amended the act. Those acts were wholly repealed by section 1 of, and the first schedule to, the Statute Law Revision Act 1948 (11 & 12 Geo. 6. c. 62), which came into force on 30 July 1948.

The whole act was repealed by section 83 of the Highways Act 1773 (13 Geo. 3. c. 78), which came into force on 21 September 1773.

The act was described by the Select Committee on Temporary Laws in 1796 as a Consolidation Act.
