= Highways Act 1662 =

Act of the Parliament of England

- Act of Parliament
- Parliament of England
- Long title: An Act for enlarging and repairing of Common Highwayes.
- Citation: 14 Cha. 2. c. 6 (Note: This is the citation in The Statutes of the Realm.); 13 & 14 Cha. 2. c. 6 (Note: This is the citation in The Statutes at Large.)
- Territorial extent: England and Wales

Dates
- Royal assent: 19 May 1662
- Commencement: 7 January 1662 (Note: Start of session.)
- Repealed: 28 July 1863
Other legislation
Amended by	Highways Act 1678
Repealed by	Statute Law Revision Act 1863
Relates to	Highways Act 1695

Status: Repealed

Text of statute as originally enacted

The Highways Act 1662 (14 Cha. 2. c. 6) was an act of the Parliament of England.

== Subsequent developments ==
The whole act was repealed by section 1 of, and the schedule to, the Statute Law Revision Act 1863 (26 & 27 Vict. c. 125), which came into force on 28 July 1863.

The act was meant to be a general law for England and Wales, it specifically targeted the Wealds of Surrey, Sussex, and Kent.
