= Highway Act 1864 =

Act of the Parliament of the United Kingdom

Highway Act 1864 (Note: Section 1.)
- Act of Parliament
- Parliament of the United Kingdom
- Long title: An Act to amend the Act for the better Management of Highways in England
- Citation: 27 & 28 Vict. c. 101
- Territorial extent: United Kingdom

Dates
- Royal assent: 29 July 1864
- Commencement: 29 July 1864 (Note: The Acts of Parliament (Commencement) Act 1793.)
- Repealed: 27 July 1971
Other legislation
Amends	Highway Act 1862
Amended by	Local Government Act 1933; Highways Act 1959
Repealed by	Statute Law (Repeals) Act 1971

Status: Repealed

Text of statute as originally enacted

The Highway Act 1864 (27 & 28 Vict. c. 101) was an act of the Parliament of the United Kingdom that amended and supplemented the existing Highway Acts framework, by making provision for the constitution and administration of highway districts, the election and duties of waywardens and surveyors, and related procedural and financial matters concerning the repair and maintenance of public highways in England and Wales.

== Background ==
A series of Highway Act began in 1835, governing the maintenance and administration of public roads in England and Wales. In 1862, another act allowed justices of the peace to divide counties into highway districts, grouping parishes for collective highway management under a highway board.

The act was introduced as an amendment and consolidating measure to clarify disputes and gaps that had arisen under earlier acts and to amend procedures for grouping parishes.

== Provisions ==
The act (as enacted) contains several key provisions, including:

- Provisions for short titles and construction, providing that the 1864 Act should be construed as one with the Highway Act 1862 (so that both Acts operate together as the "Highway Acts").
- Definitions and administrative rules for "poor law parishes", "highway parishes", and highway districts, clarifying when parts of parishes could be treated as separate highway places for the purposes of forming districts and levying rates.
- Amendments to the procedures by which justices could form, alter or combine highway districts and by which waywardens (local highway officers) were chosen and regulated.
- Detailed provisions on the raising and application of highway rates (local levies for highway maintenance), the administration of district funds, and limits on expenditure and accounting.

== Administration and enforcement ==
The act removed reliance on parish and district officers and the justices of peace for supervising and ordering functions. The act's regulations oversaw the constitution of highway boards and the relationship between local governing bodies and the county justices when forming or altering highway districts. Parliamentary records from the passage of the Bill record debates on these administrative matters.

== Subsequent developments ==
Parts of the act were later amended by subsequent highway and local government legislation. Some provisions were modified or repealed by later acts such as the Highways and Locomotives (Amendment) Act 1878 (41 & 42 Vict. c. 77) and successive statute law revision measures; portions of the 1864 act were explicitly repealed or superseded by later enactments as the law governing highways was progressively reformed into the late 19th and 20th centuries.

The whole act was repealed by section 1 of, and the part IX of the schedule to, the Statute Law (Repeals) Act 1971, which came into force on 27 July 1971.

== See also ==
- Highway Act 1835
- Highway Act 1862
- Locomotive Acts
