= Driving without due care and attention =

Type of moving traffic violation

Driving without due care and attention or careless driving is a legal term for a particular type of moving traffic violation related to aggressive driving in the United States, Canada (at least in Ontario), the United Kingdom, and Ireland. It is often punishable by fines or endorsements like suspensions on a driver's license.

It is usually a less serious offence than reckless driving (United States, Canada) or dangerous driving (United Kingdom, Canada).

== United Kingdom ==
In England and Wales and Scotland this offence was created by section 3 of the Road Traffic Act 1988 (as substituted by section 2 of the Road Traffic Act 1991). It carries a punishment of between three and nine penalty points and a fine of up to £5,000.

The Road Traffic Act 1991 amended the same act to insert section 3A, which creates the offence of "causing death by careless driving when under the influence of drink or drugs", punishable by up to 14 years in prison with mandatory disqualification and 3–11 penalty points. The Road Safety Act 2006 additionally inserted section 2A, creating the offence of "causing death by careless or inconsiderate driving", without the requirement of intoxication; the sentence is 12 months' imprisonment (6 in Scotland) plus a fine up to the statutory maximum on summary conviction, or 5 years' imprisonment and/or a fine on indictment, plus mandatory disqualification and 3–11 penalty points.

Examples of concentration lapses include being distracted by passengers, adjusting the radio and looking at satellite navigation systems (GPS). It is not necessary for a collision or other incident to occur for the offence to be prosecuted. For example, a close pass of a cyclist (contrary to Highway Code rule 163), typically defined as passing within 1.5 metres, is frequently prosecuted as careless driving regardless of actual attention; in extreme cases, convictions of dangerous driving for close passing without contact have survived appeal.

== See also ==
- Red flag traffic laws
- United Kingdom traffic laws
