= Highway district =

Type of district in England and Wales

Highway districts were areas in England and Wales united for the maintenance and repair of highways. They were first formed in 1862 and consisted of groupings of civil parishes in rural areas. They were abolished in 1894 when their powers and duties passed to rural district councils.

== Background ==
Parish vestries had been responsible for keeping highways in repair since the reign of Henry VIII. The Highway Act 1835 (5 & 6 Will. 4. c. 50) made changes to the administration of highways. From 1836 each parish was to appoint a surveyor, and was empowered to make a rate to keep the roads under its control in good order. The surveyor could be convicted and fined by the county justices for failing to keep the highways in repair. The 1835 Act also changed the law, with new roads not being declared highways, and therefore repairable by the parish, unless they met certain criteria.

The Highways Act 1862 (25 & 26 Vict. c. 61) enabled justices of the peace of a county to divide the county into highway districts consisting of a number of parishes. This was done by means of a provisional order confirmed by the quarter sessions. The order listed the parishes to be grouped together, the name to be given to the district and the number of waywardens to be elected by each parish.

== Highway boards ==
The authority governing the highway district was called a highway board. The membership of the board consisted of one or more members elected annually by each parish, and known as waywardens, and by any county justices residing in the district.

The highway board took over the property and liabilities of the parish surveyors in its district, appointing a clerk, treasurer and district surveyor. The costs of the administration was to be paid by a rate levied on the district, although the cost of repairing highways was still chargeable as a highway rate to individual parishes.

There was no compulsion for districts to be formed, and some parishes continued to separately maintain highways until 1894.

== Areas exempt ==
The Highways Act 1862 did not extend to all areas of England and Wales. Places within the area of the Metropolitan Board of Works, boroughs and towns having local boards could not be grouped into a district. The Isle of Wight and parts of South Wales were also exempt, as special legislation was already in place to establish highway authorities in those areas.

The act stated that any place adopting the Local Government Act 1858 to form a local board would cease to be part of a highway district. A large number of communities, some with very small populations, quickly chose to form boards and avoid being part of a district. The number of applications was such that the Local Government Act Amendment Act 1863 (26 & 27 Vict. c. 17) was passed providing that no local board could be formed after 1 March 1863 with a population of fewer than 3,000, and that any local board which had not appointed a surveyor within three months of formation would be dissolved.

== Changes in legislation ==
The Highways and Locomotives (Amendment) Act 1878 (41 & 42 Vict. c. 77) created a new class of highway – the main road. The act provided that all former turnpike roads that had become public highways since 1870 were designated as main roads. Other main roads were to be those between "great towns" and those leading to railway stations. In addition any other highway could be declared a main road by the justices of the county in quarter sessions. Half the cost of maintaining main roads was to be borne by the county at large.

The Local Government Act 1888 passed responsibility for main roads to the new county councils from 1889, who were to bear all of the cost of their upkeep. The highway boards continued to have responsibility for highways other than main roads.

== Abolition ==
The Local Government Act 1894 (56 & 57 Vict. c. 73) passed all the powers, duties and liabilities of existing highway boards, highway authorities or surveyors to the newly created rural district councils. Rural district councils continued to exercise these powers until 1930, when the Local Government Act 1929 transferred responsibility for rural highways to county councils.

== See also ==
- Highways Act 1862
- Local Government Act 1894
