= Dangerous driving =

Statutory vehicular offence in British law

In United Kingdom law, dangerous driving is a statutory offence related to aggressive driving. It is also a term of art used in the definition of the offence of causing death by dangerous driving. It replaces the former offence of reckless driving. Canada's Criminal Code has equivalent provisions covering dangerous driving (see "Canada" section below).

== England, Wales and Scotland ==
=== Statute ===
This offence is created by section 2 of the Road Traffic Act 1988 (as substituted by section 1 of the Road Traffic Act 1991):

A person who drives a mechanically propelled vehicle dangerously on a road or other public place is guilty of an offence.

==== "Dangerously" ====
A person is to be regarded as driving dangerously for sections 1 and 2 of the Road Traffic Act 1988 if

- the way he/she drives falls far below what would be expected of a competent and careful driver, and it would be obvious to a competent and careful driver that driving in that way would be dangerous; or
- if it would be obvious to a competent and careful driver that driving the vehicle in its current state (for the determination of which regard may be had to anything attached to or carried on or in it, and to the manner in which it is attached or carried) would be dangerous.

In this context, "dangerous" refers to danger either of injury to any person or of serious property damage; and in determining what would be expected of, or obvious to, a competent and careful driver in a particular case, regard shall be had not only to the circumstances of which he could be expected to be aware but also to any circumstances shown to have been within the knowledge of the accused.

In Attorney General's Reference (No 4 of 2000) (2001) 2 Cr. App. R. 417 Woolf CJ said at p 422:

The essential limbs, as is common ground, do not require any specific intent to drive dangerously. Section 2A sets out a wholly objective test. The concept of what is obvious to a careful driver places the question of what constitutes dangerous driving within the province of the jury.

Thus, whereas the underlying test of dangerousness is objective, a test based on the concept of "obviousness" considers the extent of knowledge as to causation. This test is hybrid, drawing both on the actual subjective knowledge that the accused had in his or her mind at the time the actus reus of driving occurred, and on the knowledge that would have been in the mind of a reasonable person (see mens rea and criminal negligence for discussion on the nature of these tests and the scope of the reasonable person).

The Court of Appeal held in the case of R v Bannister that police drivers get no special treatment. "The special skill (or indeed lack of skill) of a driver is an irrelevant circumstance when considering whether the driving is dangerous".

=== Sentence ===
In England and Wales and Scotland, a person guilty of dangerous driving is liable, on conviction on indictment, to imprisonment for any term not exceeding two years, or to a fine, or to both, or on summary conviction, to imprisonment for any term not exceeding six months, or to a fine not exceeding the statutory maximum, or to both.

Any conviction for dangerous driving (or causing death by dangerous driving) for a driver holding a licence issued by the Driver and Vehicle Agency (Northern Ireland) or Driver and Vehicle Licensing Agency (for licences issued in England, Wales or Scotland) will result in a mandatory disqualification if the offence took place in the United Kingdom proper, Isle of Man or Republic of Ireland (see also Traffic violations reciprocity). The driver must return to being a learner driver, even if the offence did not result in death or grievous bodily harm, and an extended practical driving test, about 70 minutes long and about 30 minutes longer than the regular driving test, must be taken by the driver to regain his or her full driving licence.

=== History ===
The offence of causing death by reckless driving was created by section 1 of the Road Traffic Act 1972 and then by section 1 of the Road Traffic Act 1988. It was abolished, and replaced with the offence of causing death by dangerous driving by section 1 of the Road Traffic Act 1991.

After it was substituted by section 50(1) of the Criminal Law Act 1977, section 1 of the Road Traffic Act 1972 read as follows:

A person who causes the death of another person by driving a motor vehicle on a road recklessly shall be guilty of an offence.

A person guilty of this offence was liable to imprisonment for a term not exceeding five years. Guidance as to sentencing was given in R v Boswell 79 Cr App R 277, [1984] 1 WLR 1047, [1984] 3 All ER 353, 6 Cr App R (S) 257, [1984] RTR 315, [1984] Crim LR 502, CA.

The offence of dangerous driving was created by section 2 of the Road Traffic Act 1972. It was abolished by section 50 of the Criminal Law Act 1977.

The expression "motor vehicle" was defined by section 190(1), and the expressions "drive" and "road" were defined by section 196(1).

==== "Recklessly" ====
The mens rea of this offence was considered in R v Lawrence [1982] AC 510, [1981] 2 WLR 524, 73 Cr App R 1, [1981] 1 All ER 974, [1981] RTR 217, [1981] Crim LR 409, HL, reversing 71 Cr App R 291.

== Northern Ireland ==
=== Statute ===
This offence is created by article 10 of the Road Traffic (Northern Ireland) Order 1995 (S.I. 1995/2994 (N.I.)).

=== Sentence ===
A person guilty of dangerous driving is liable, on conviction on indictment, to imprisonment for any term not exceeding five years, or to a fine, or to both.

=== Causing death or grievous bodily injury by dangerous driving ===
This offence is created by article 9 of the Road Traffic (Northern Ireland) Order 1995 (S.I. 1995/2994 (N.I.)).

It carries a mandatory disqualification of at least 24 months.

== Prevention ==
Research now shows ways to reduce the intentions of people to binge drink or engage in dangerous driving. A key article by Martin, Lee, Weeks and Kaya (2013) suggests that understanding consumer personality and how people view others is important. People were shown ads talking of the harmful effects of binge drinking. People who valued close friends as a sense of who they are, were less likely to want to binge drink after seeing an ad featuring them and a close friend. People who were loners or who did not see close friends as important to their sense of who they were reacted better to ads featuring an individual. A similar pattern was shown for ads showing a person driving at dangerous speeds. This suggests ads showing potential harm to citizens from binge drinking or dangerous driving are less effective than ads highlighting a person's close friends.

== Canada ==
=== The offence ===
The offence of "dangerous operation of a conveyance" is created by section 320.13(1) of the Criminal Code. A "conveyance" is defined as "a motor vehicle, a vessel, an aircraft or railway equipment". The actus reus of the offence is "driving in a manner dangerous to the public, having regard to all the circumstances". The mens rea of the offence is "that the degree of care exercised by the accused was a marked departure from the standard of care that a reasonable person would observe in the accused’s circumstances".

=== Excluding causing death or bodily harm by dangerous driving ===
The equivalent, under the country's Criminal Code, to "dangerous driving", is Dangerous Operation of a Motor Vehicle. The offence can be tried summarily or on indictment. The maximum prison sentences that can be imposed are:

- if tried summarily, 2 years minus one day.
- if tried by indictment, 10 years.

A licence suspension is mandatory, and will be for a minimum of 12 months if the person has no prior Criminal Code driving convictions on his or her record. Anyone with a prior conviction for a Criminal Code driving offence will receive a longer licence suspension, but will also receive a prison sentence. Some provinces count equivalents to Criminal Code driving convictions, if such convictions occur in certain American states. The Ontario Ministry of Transportation counts equivalents, to Criminal Code driving convictions, if they occur in New York or Michigan. Those equivalent to dangerous driving are included.

=== Causing death or bodily harm ===
Dangerous operation causing bodily harm is a hybrid offence and may be tried summarily or by indictment. Dangerous operation causing death may only be tried by indictment. Custodial sentences will almost always be given as a result of a conviction for either type of dangerous driving charge.

Anyone convicted of dangerous operation causing bodily harm is subject to a maximum prison sentence of 14 years. The Criminal Code defines bodily harm as "any hurt or injury to a person that interferes with the health or comfort of the person and that is more than merely transient or trifling in nature".

Anyone convicted of dangerous operation causing death is subject to a maximum sentence of life imprisonment.

Although the minimum driving prohibition of 12 months (or more, if the conviction or guilty plea is to a 2nd or subsequent Criminal Code offence) applies to any conviction of causing death or grievous bodily harm by dangerous driving, driving prohibitions, in these cases, are often longer than 12 months.

Some provinces, such as Ontario, Alberta and Nova Scotia, require the resitting of all theory and practical driving tests if the licence suspension is longer than a prescribed time period.

== See also ==
- Driving without due care and attention
- United Kingdom traffic laws
