= Highway Act 1835 =

Act of the Parliament of the United Kingdom

Highway Act 1835 (Note: Section 1 of the Highway Act 1864 (27 & 28 Vict. c. 101).) (Note: The citation of this act by this short title was authorised by section 1 of, and the first schedule to, the Short Titles Act 1896. Due to the repeal of those provisions it is now authorised by section 19(2) of the Interpretation Act 1978.)
- Act of Parliament
- Parliament of the United Kingdom
- Long title: An Act to consolidate and amend the Laws relating to Highways in England.
- Citation: 5 & 6 Will. 4. c. 50
- Territorial extent: United Kingdom

Dates
- Royal assent: 31 August 1835
- Commencement: 20 March 1836 (Note: Section 119.)

Other legislation
- Amends: Excessive Loading of Vehicles, London and Westminster Act 1719; Carts on Highways Act 1744; Highways Act 1750; Traffic on Highways Act 1757
- Repeals/revokes: Highways Act 1773; Highway Act 1794; Highways (No. 2) Act 1794; Militia Act 1802; Statute Duty Act 1804; Highways (England) Act 1814; Highways, etc. (England) Act 1815
- Amended by: Highway Act 1841; Highway Act 1845; Highway Act 1864; Statute Law Revision Act 1874; Highways and Locomotives (Amendment) Act 1878; Highway Rate Assessment and Expenditure Act 1882; Summary Jurisdiction Act 1884; Statute Law Revision (No. 2) Act 1888; Public Authorities Protection Act 1893; Local Government Act 1894; Costs in Criminal Cases Act 1908; Rating and Valuation Act 1925; Local Government Act 1933; Justices of the Peace Act 1949; Statute Law Revision Act 1950; Highways Act 1959; London Government Act 1963; General Rate Act 1967; Criminal Justice Act 1967; Courts Act 1971; Statute Law (Repeals) Act 1973; Statute Law (Repeals) Act 1975; Criminal Justice Act 1982; Statute Law (Repeals) Act 1989
- Relates to: Local Government Act 1888

Status: Partially repealed

Text of statute as originally enacted

Revised text of statute as amended

Text of the Highway Act 1835 as in force today (including any amendments) within the United Kingdom, from legislation.gov.uk.

The Highway Act 1835 (5 & 6 Will. 4. c. 50) is an act of the Parliament of the United Kingdom. It was one of the Highway Acts 1835 to 1885.

Most of the act has been repealed; as of 2025, only three sections remain in force.

== Parish boards ==
The act placed highways under the direction of parish surveyors, and allowed them to recover the costs involved by rates levied on the occupiers of land. The surveyor's duty is to keep the highways in repair, and if a highway is out of repair, the surveyor may be summoned before the courts and ordered to complete the repairs within a limited time. The surveyor is also charged with the removal of nuisances on the highway. A highway nuisance may be abated by any person, and may be made the subject of indictment at common law.

The board consists of representatives of the various parishes, called "way wardens", together with the justices for the county residing within the district. Salaries and similar expenses incurred by the board are charged on a district fund to which the several parishes contribute; but each parish remains separately responsible for the expenses of maintaining its own highways.

The amending acts, while not interfering with the operation of the principal act, authorise the creation of highway districts on a larger scale. The justices of a county may convert it or any portion of it into a highway district to be governed by a highway board, the powers and responsibilities of which will be the same as those of the parish surveyor under the former act.

== New road offences ==
The act specified as offences for which the driver of a carriage on the public highway might be punished by a fine, in addition to any civil action that might be brought against him:

- Riding upon the cart, or upon any horse drawing it, and not having some other person to guide it, unless there be some person driving it. (Note: The Highway Act 1835, section 78: "That if the Driver of any Drivers of Waggon, Cart, or other Carriage of any Kind shall ride upon any such Carriage, or upon any Horse or Horses drawing the same, on any Highway, not having some other Person on Foot or on Horseback unless some to guide the same (such Carriages and Carts as are driven with Reins, other Person and are conducted by some Person holding the Reins of all the Horses guide them. drawing the same, excepted)")
- Negligence causing damage to person or goods being conveyed on the highway (Note: The Highway Act 1835, section 78)
- Quitting his cart, or leaving control of the horses, or leaving the cart so as to be an obstruction on the highway.
- Not having the owner's name painted up. (Note: The Highway Act 1835, section 76)
- Refusing to give the same.
- Driving animals or a 'carriage of any description' on the footway. (Note: The Highway Act 1835, section 72: "If any person shall wilfully ride upon any footpath or causeway by the side of any road made or set apart for the use or accommodation of foot passengers; or shall wilfully lead or drive any horse, ass, sheep, mule, swine, or cattle or carriage of any description, or any truck or sledge, upon any such footpath or causeway; or shall tether any horse, ass, mule, swine, or cattle, on any highway, so as to suffer or permit the tethered animal to be thereon." (Section 72 - see below for details))
- Not keeping on the left or near side of the road, when meeting any other carriage or horse. This rule does not apply in the case of a carriage meeting a foot-passenger, but a driver is bound to use due care to avoid driving against any person crossing the highway on foot. At the same time a passenger crossing the highway is also bound to use due care in avoiding vehicles, and the mere fact of a driver being on the wrong side of the road would not be evidence of negligence in such a case.
- The playing of football on public highways, with a maximum penalty of forty shillings. (Note: The Highway Act 1835, section 72 (since repealed) if any person [...] shall play at Foot-ball or any other Game on any Part of the said Highways, to the Annoyance of any Passenger or Passengers [... shall] pay any Sum not exceeding Forty Shillings)

== Protecting footpaths ==
Section 72 provides:

If any person shall wilfully ride upon any footpath or causeway by the side of any road made or set apart for the use or accommodation of foot passengers; or shall wilfully lead or drive any horse, ass, sheep, mule, swine, or cattle or carriage of any description, or any truck or sledge, upon any such footpath or causeway; or shall tether any horse, ass, mule, swine, or cattle, on any highway, so as to suffer or permit the tethered animal to be thereon.

This clause is referred to by the current Highway Code:

Rule 64: You MUST NOT cycle on a pavement. HA 1835 sect 72 & R(S)A sect 129

Rule 145, 1988: "You MUST NOT drive on or over a pavement, footpath or bridleway except to gain lawful access to property, or in the case of an emergency."

The offence of driving on a bridleway is covered by a later act.

Rule 157, 1973: "[A non-road legal] vehicle MUST NOT be used on roads, pavements, footpaths or bridleways."

The Department for Transport cited this section in 2006 when it ruled that Segways could not be legally used on pavements in the United Kingdom, and again in 2020 when it expanded the ruling to include private e-scooters.

In August 2024, a 36 year old man from Sunderland was charged with causing common danger by riding a pedal cycle in the hours of darkness with no illumination, contrary to the 1835 act.

== Repealed enactments ==
Section 1 of the act repealed 11 enactments, listed in that section.

Citation	Short title	Description	Extent of repeal
6 Geo. 1. c. 6	Excessive Loading of Vehicles, London and Westminster Act 1719	An Act passed in the Sixth Year of the Reign of King George the First, intituled An Act for preventing the Carriage of excessive Loads of Meal, Malt, Bricks, and Coals within Ten Miles of the Cities of London and Westminster.	As relates to the Carriage of Bricks, except so far as the same relates to the City of London.
18 Geo. 2. c. 33	Carts on Highways Act 1744	An Act passed in the Eighteenth Year of the Reign of King George the Second, intituled An Act to repeal a Clause made in the Third Year of the Reign of King William and Queen Mary, relating to Carts used by Persons inhabiting within the Limits of the 'Weekly Bills of Mortality, and to allow such Carts to be drawn with Three Horses, and to prevent the Misbehaviour of the Drivers of Carts in Streets within the said Limits.	Except so far as the same relates to the City of London
24 Geo. 2. c. 43	Highways Act 1750	An Act passed in the Twenty-fourth Year of the Reign of King George the Second, intituled An Act for the more effectual Preservation of the Turnpike Roads in that Part of Great Britain called England, and for the Disposition of Penalties given by Acts of Parliament relating to the Highways in that Part of Great Britain called England, and for enforcing the Recovery thereof; and for the more effectual preventing the Mischiefs occasioned by the Drivers riding upon Carts, Drays, Carrs, and Waggons in the City of London and within Ten Miles thereof, as relates to the preventing Mischief occasioned by the Drivers riding upon Carts, Drays, Carrs, and Waggons in the City of London or within Ten Miles thereof.	Except so far as the same relates to the City of London.
30 Geo. 2. c. 22	Traffic on Highways Act 1757	An Act passed in the Thirtieth Year of the Reign of King George the Second, intituled An Act to explain and amend an Act made in the Eighteenth Year of His present Majesty's Reign, to prevent the Misbehaviour of the Drivers of Carts in the Streets in London, Westminster, and the Limits of the Weekly Bills of Mortality, and for other Purposes in this Act mentioned.	Except so far as the same relates to the City of London.
13 Geo. 3. c. 78	Highways Act 1773	An Act passed in the Thirteenth Year of the Reign of King George the Third, intituled An Act to explain, amend, and reduce into One Act of Parliament the Statutes now in being for the Amendment and Preservation of the public Highways within that Part of Great Britain called England, and for other Purposes.	The whole act.
34 Geo. 3. c. 64	Highway Act 1794	An Act passed in the Thirty-fourth Year of the Reign of King George the Third, intituled An Act for the more effectually repairing of such Parts of the Highways of this Kingdom as are to be repaired by Two Parishes	The whole act.
34 Geo. 3. c. 74	Highways (No. 2) Act 1794	An Act passed in the same Thirty-fourth Year of the Reign of George the Third, intituled An Act for varying some of the Provisions in an Act of the Thirteenth Year of His present Majesty's Reign, respecting the public Highways within that Part of Great Britain called England, which relate to the Performance of Statute Duty.	The whole act.
42 Geo. 3. c. 90	Militia Act 1802	An Act passed in the Forty-second Year of the Reign of King George the Third, intituled An Act for amending the Laws relating to the Militia in England, and for augmenting the Militia.	As relates to the Exemption of any Serjeant, Corporal, Drummer, or Private of the Militia from performing Highway Duty, commonly called Statute Duty.
44 Geo. 3. c. 52	Statute Duty Act 1804	An Act passed in the Forty-fourth Year of the Reign of King George the Third, intituled An Act to alter and amend so much of an Act passed in the Thirty-fourth Year of His present Majesty as relates to the Amount of the Sums to be paid by Persons compounding for the Performance of Statute Duty.	The whole act.
54 Geo. 3. c. 109	Highways (England) Act 1814	An Act passed in the Fifty-fourth Year of the Reign of King George the Third, intituled An Act to amend an Act of the Thirteenth Year of His present Majesty, to explain, amend, and reduce into One Act the Statutes now in force for the Amendment and Preservation of the public Highways within England, and for other Purposes.	The whole act.
55 Geo. 3. c. 68	Highways, etc. (England) Act 1815	An Act passed in the Fifty-fifth Year of the Reign of King George the Third, intituled An Act to amend an Act of the Thirteenth Year of His present Majesty, for the Amendment and Preservation of the public Highways, in so far as the same relates to Notice of Appeal against turning or diverting a public Highway, and to extend the Provisions of the same Act to the stopping up of unnecessary Roads.	The whole act.

== Subsequent developments ==
The Public Health Act 1875 (38 & 39 Vict. c. 55) vested the powers and duties of surveyors of highways and vestries in urban authorities,

The Local Government Act 1888 (51 & 52 Vict. c. 41) gave the responsibility of maintaining main roads to county councils.

Section 109 of the act was repealed by section 2 of, and the schedule to, the Public Authorities Protection Act 1893 (56 & 57 Vict. c. 61), which came into force on 1 January 1894.

Sections 42 and 43 of the act were repealed by section 1(1) of, and the first schedule to, the Statute Law Revision Act 1950 (14 Geo. 6. c. 6), which came into force on 23 May 1950.

Sections 50 and 76, and in section 78, the words from " or if any person ", where first occurring, to " principal owners of such waggon, cart or carriage ", were repealed by section 1(1) of, and part VI of schedule 1 to, the Statute Law (Repeals) Act 1973, which came into force on 18 July 1973.
