= Road Traffic Offenders Act 1988 =

Act of the Parliament of the United Kingdom

Road Traffic Offenders Act 1988 (Note: Section 99(1).)
- Act of Parliament
- Parliament of the United Kingdom
- Long title: An Act to consolidate certain enactments relating to the prosecution and punishment (including punishment without conviction) of road traffic offences, with amendments to give effect to recommendations of the Law Commission and the Scottish Law Commission.
- Citation: 1988 c. 53
- Territorial extent: England and Wales; Scotland; (Note: Section 99(3)–(7).)

Dates
- Royal assent: 15 November 1988
- Commencement: 15 May 1988 (Note: Section 99(2).)

Other legislation
- Amended by: Road Traffic Act 1991; Aggravated Vehicle-Taking Act 1992; Criminal Justice Act 1993; Vehicle Excise and Registration Act 1994; Criminal Procedure (Consequential Provisions) (Scotland) Act 1995; Countryside and Rights of Way Act 2000; Crime (International Co-operation) Act 2003; Statute Law (Repeals) Act 2004; Domestic Violence, Crime and Victims Act 2004; Criminal Justice and Courts Act 2015; Sentencing Act 2020; Automated Vehicles Act 2024; Sentencing Act 2026
- Relates to: Road Traffic Act 1988; Road Traffic (Consequential Provisions) Act 1988

Status: Amended

Text of statute as originally enacted

Revised text of statute as amended

Text of the Road Traffic Offenders Act 1988 as in force today (including any amendments) within the United Kingdom, from legislation.gov.uk.

The Road Traffic Offenders Act 1988 (c. 53) is an act of the Parliament of the United Kingdom consolidating legislation governing the prosecution, conviction, and punishment of road traffic offences, including fixed penalties, disqualification, and endorsement of driving licences. It covers the English, Welsh, and Scottish territories.

For Scotland, it introduced the new schedule (Schedule 5, Section 75) which added new laws to the pre-existing Road Traffic Regulation Act 1984 and Roads (Scotland) Act 1984.

The enactments consolidated by the act were repealed by section 1 of, and schedule 2 to, the Road Traffic (Consequential Provisions) Act 1988, a companion act passed on the same day.

== Provisions ==
Category	Summary	Source	Note
Fixed penalty notices (FPNs)	the act regulates when a fixed penalty can be offered instead of prosecution.		
Disqualification and endorsement	Provides for disqualification of driving licences and endorsement of offences on driving records.		
Warning and time limits for prosecution	Requires certain procedural safeguards: e.g. warning at time of offence, or notice/summons within 14 days.		See section 1 and related provisions.
Regulations	The Secretary of State can make regulations concerning notices, fixed penalties, and court procedures.		
Statutory declaration	Allows statutory declaration under certain circumstances (e.g. to contest a notice).		
Penalties	Defines fines, imprisonment (where applicable), and range of penalties for specific offences.		Maximum punishments set out in schedule/sections.

== Legal and historical context ==
the act combines previous legislations to organise prosecution and punishment. Recommendations were assigned from the Law Commission and the Scottish Law Commission.

== Amendments ==
Many sections have been amended since 1988. the act corresponds with other road traffic legislation (e.g. Road Traffic Act 1988) in clarifying and prosecuting driving offences.

The Road Traffic Act 1991 modified Part III (fixed penalties). This was done to adapt the act to changing traffic-law and licensing. The Statute Law (Repeals) Act 2004 repealed several obsolete provisions, including section 59, section 52(4), section 99(5), the reason being that they were "no longer of practical utility". The Road Safety Act 2006 added new sections, such as section 58A (effect of endorsement of driving record without hearing), which was also done to adapt to changing traffic-law. A major overhaul of the act was done by the Police, Crime, Sentencing and Courts Act 2022 (PCSC 2022), where it was updated to include information about identification (section 52), surrendering a driving licence, and fixed penalty notices.

== Reception ==
The Sentencing Council describes how courts apply penalties and endorsements provided under the act, including "causing death by careless or inconsiderate driving" and disqualification processes.

Guidance for those with motoring convictions, like that published by Unlock, discusses how endorsements and penalties imposed under the act impact on rehabilitation periods under the Rehabilitation of Offenders Act.

A House of Commons paper on the Road Safety Bill records amendments made to provisions of the act.

== See also ==
- Road Traffic Act 1988
- United Kingdom traffic laws
- Driving license in the United Kingdom
- Fixed penalty notice
