= Highways Act 1562 =

Act of the Parliament of England

- Act of Parliament
- Parliament of England
- Long title: An Act for the Continuance of the Statute made 2 & 3 P. & M. for the Amendment of Highways.
- Citation: 5 Eliz. 1. c. 13
- Territorial extent: England and Wales

Dates
- Royal assent: 10 April 1563
- Commencement: 11 January 1563 (Note: Start of session.)
- Expired: 11 January 1583 (Note: Section 8. The end of the next parliament 20 years after the beginning of this parliament.)
- Repealed: 21 September 1767
Other legislation
Amends	Highways Act 1555
Amended by	Continuance, etc. of Laws Act 1584; Continuance, etc. of Laws Act 1586
Repealed by	Highways (No. 2) Act 1766

Status: Repealed

Text of statute as originally enacted

The Highways Act 1562 (5 Eliz. 1. c. 13), sometimes the Second Statute of Highways, was an act of the Parliament of England, that was passed in 1563, which extended the provisions of the Highways Act 1555 (2 & 3 Ph. & M. c. 8).

== Background ==
The Highways Act 1555 (2 & 3 Ph. & M. c. 8) was an act, passed in 1555 during the reign of Queen Mary I, which mandated that every householder of a parish had to provide four days labour in a year on the highways.

== Provisions ==
The act amended the original act by extending the provisions for a further twenty years, and made the requirement six days labour rather than four. Supervisors of highway work were empowered to take debris from quarries and dig for gravel without permission of the landowners. The act also empowered justices of the peace at quarter sessions to investigate and punish supervisors in cases where they were in dereliction of their duties, imposing fines as thought to be necessary.

== Subsequent developments ==
The act was continued until the end of the next session of parliament effective from the Feast of Pentecost by section 1 of the Continuance, etc. of Laws Act 1584 (27 Eliz. 1. c. 11).

The act was made perpetual by section 1 of the Continuance, etc. of Laws Act 1586 (29 Eliz. 1. c. 5)

The whole act was repealed by section 57 of the Highways (No. 2) Act 1766 (7 Geo. 3. c. 42).

== Bibliography ==
- Tanner, J. R. (1951). Tudor Constitutional Documents, AD 1485-1603. Cambridge University Press.
