= Road Traffic Act 1988 =

Act of the Parliament of the United Kingdom

Road Traffic Act 1988 (Note: Section 197(1).)
- Act of Parliament
- Parliament of the United Kingdom
- Long title: An Act to consolidate certain enactments relating to road traffic with amendments to give effect to recommendations of the Law Commission and the Scottish Law Commission.
- Citation: 1988 c. 52
- Territorial extent: England and Wales; Scotland; Northern Ireland (in part); (Note: Section 197(3). While the majority of the act extends only to Great Britain, the provisions of the act concerning driving under the influence, insofar as they apply to 'persons subject to service discipline' (members of the armed forces and civilians subject to service discipline) and section 80, concerning type approval marks, extend to Northern Ireland as well.)

Dates
- Royal assent: 15 November 1988
- Commencement: 15 May 1989 (Note: Section 197(2).)
Other legislation
Amends	Road Traffic Act 1960
Amended by	Road Traffic Act 1991; Statute Law (Repeals) Act 1993; Goods Vehicles (Licensing of Operators) Act 1995; Countryside and Rights of Way Act 2000; Crime (International Co-operation) Act 2003; Statute Law (Repeals) Act 2004; National Health Service (Consequential Provisions) Act 2006; Consumer Insurance (Disclosure and Representations) Act 2012; Scotland Act 2012; Immigration Act 2014; Criminal Justice and Courts Act 2015; Insurance Act 2015; Infrastructure Act 2015; Scotland Act 2016; Policing and Crime Act 2017; Wales Act 2017; Sentencing Act 2020; Automated Vehicles Act 2024
Relates to	Road Traffic Offenders Act 1988; Road Traffic (Consequential Provisions) Act 1988

Status: Amended

Text of statute as originally enacted

Revised text of statute as amended

Text of the Road Traffic Act 1988 as in force today (including any amendments) within the United Kingdom, from legislation.gov.uk.

The Road Traffic Act 1988 (c. 52) is an act of the Parliament of the United Kingdom, concerning licensing of vehicles, insurance and road regulation. The majority of the act's provisions extend to Great Britain only.

The enactments consolidated by the act were repealed by section 1 of, and schedule 2 to, the Road Traffic (Consequential Provisions) Act 1988, a companion act passed on the same day.

== Contents ==
Part I contains a number of traffic offences including causing death by dangerous driving, driving under the influence of alcohol or drugs (including police powers to arrest, administer tests, etc.), as well as requirements to wear seat belts and motorcycle helmets.

Part II is concerned with regulating the construction and use of motor vehicles, and includes powers to test, inspect and prohibit vehicles that do not meet standards.

Part III sets out the law on driving tests, the requirements for issuing driving licences, and the process for disqualifying drivers.

Part IV deals with the licences required for driving large goods vehicles and passenger-carrying vehicles (buses and coaches).

Part V concerns the registration, licensing and examination of driving instructors.

Part VI contains provisions concerning compulsory vehicle insurance against third-party risks.

Part VII contains miscellaneous provisions.

== See also ==
- Road Traffic Act 1930
- Road Traffic Regulation Act 1984
