= Highways in England and Wales =

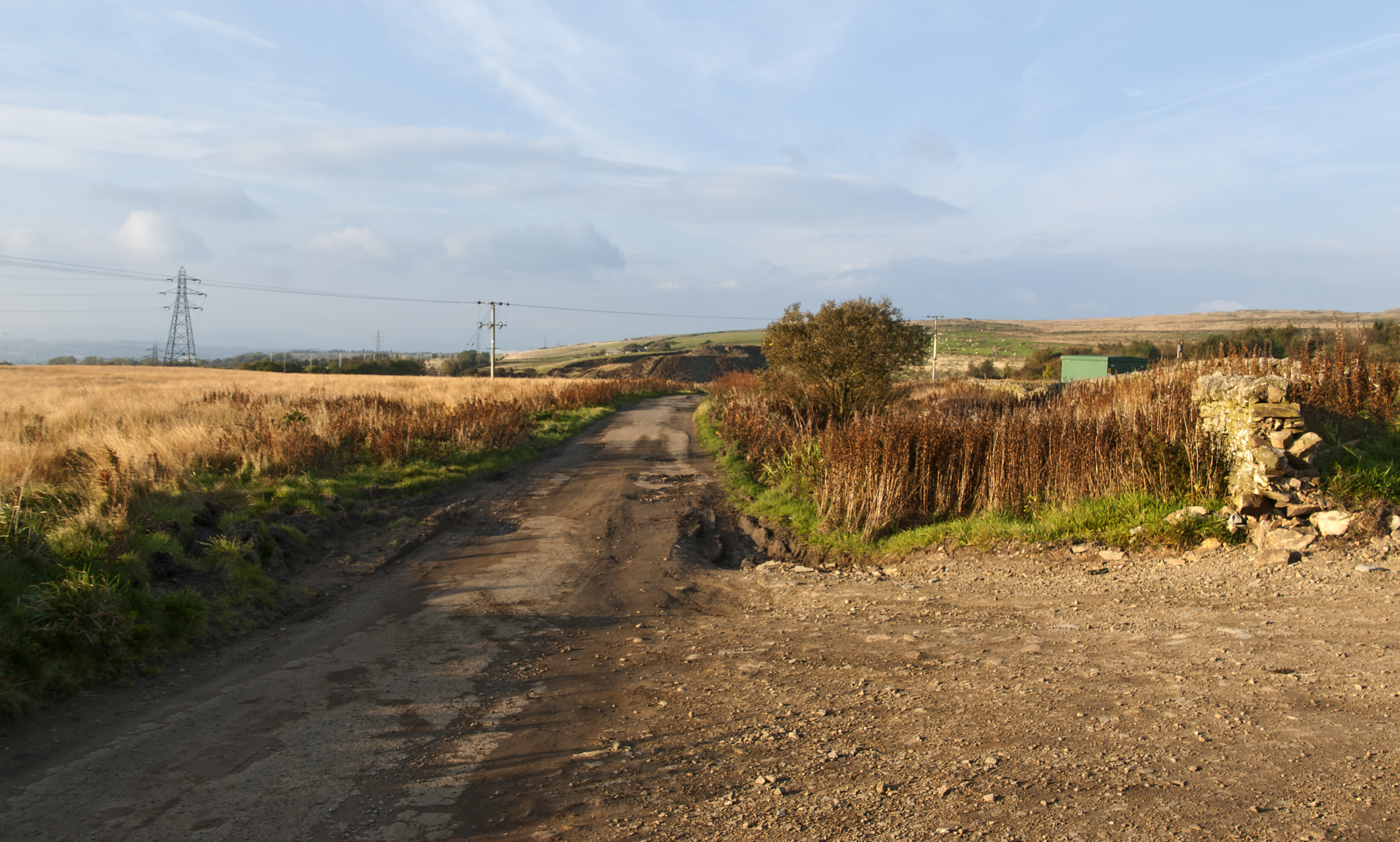
The King's Highway at Black Moss, Lancashire. Dating to the 12th century or earlier, it runs from Padiham to Haslingden.

In the common law of England and Wales, a highway (Welsh: priffordd) occurs where there is a public right of passage over land at all times "without let or hindrance" that follows a particular route. Thus, an area of common land or a village green will not be a highway, although it may contain one.

There are three kinds:-

1. A footpath is a highway over which there is a public right of passage for pedestrians.
2. A bridleway is a highway that does not permit motor vehicles. Some bridleways also debar the driving of cattle.
3. A carriageway allows vehicles, animals and pedestrians.

Highways are vital for tenants and landowners because most property needs a means of access from the public highway. A property with no such means of access is called "landlocked", which has serious consequences for its value and use.

The main statute governing highways is the Highways Act 1980. This gives responsibility for most highways to local councils, although trunk roads lie directly with the Secretary of State.

== Creation ==
A highway may be created in law by:-

1. 20 years' uninterrupted use by the public. Landowners sometimes prevent this by erecting notices that state no public right of way may arise, or by preventing use for a day (such as by padlocking a gate).
2. Dedication, in which the local authority is given notice to take over an area of land as a highway. It may object if the land is not sufficiently useful to the public.
3. Ancient use (public use of the way before the Highways Act 1835 came into force)

== Partial table of cases ==
- Suffolk County Council v Mason [1979] AC 705.
- Todd, Bradley v The Secretary of State for Environment Food and Rural Affairs [2004] EWHC 1450.
- Barrett v Director of Public Prosecutions [2009] EWHC 423.
- Ernstbrunner v Manchester City Council and Another [2009] EWHC 3293.

== Sources ==
Hubbard, Tom. On the Road to Nowhere. Estates Gazette no. 1130, 30 July 2011. pp53-54. Reed Business Information.
