= Highways Act 1555 =

Act of the Parliament of England

- Act of Parliament
- Parliament of England
- Long title: An Act for the amending of Highways.
- Citation: 2 & 3 Ph. & M. c. 8
- Territorial extent: England and Wales

Dates
- Royal assent: 9 December 1555
- Commencement: 21 October 1555 (Note: The Acts of Parliament (Commencement) Act 1793)
- Expired: 21 October 1562 (Note: Section 4. The end of the next parliament 7 years after the beginning of this parliament.)
- Repealed: 21 September 1767
Other legislation
Amended by	Highways Act 1562
Repealed by	Highways (No. 2) Act 1766

Status: Repealed

Text of statute as originally enacted

The Highways Act 1555 (2 & 3 Ph. & M. c. 8), sometimes the First Statute of Highways, was an act of the Parliament of England, which placed the burden of upkeep of the highways on individual parishes and that was passed in 1555. The act was amended, and extended, by the Highways Act 1562 (5 Eliz. 1. c. 13).

== Provisions ==
The act provided that each year, in the Easter week, every parish was to elect "two honest persons" of the parish to serve as the surveyor of highways, who would be responsible for the upkeep of those highways within the parish boundaries which ran to market towns.

The surveyors would announce, on the first Sunday after Easter and four days before 24 June, (Note: The feast-day of the nativity of John the Baptist) on which the maintenance work was to be carried out, and for these four days the whole parish was to work on the highways.

Every person, for every ploughland they held in the parish, and every other person keeping a draught team or plough there, was to provide a cart or wain equipped for the work, and two able-bodied men, on a penalty of 10s per draught; the surveyors could, at their discretion, require a further two men instead of the cart. Every other householder, as well as every other cottager and labourer free to labour, (Note: In other words, those not hired servants.) was to send themselves or a substitute able-bodied labourer to work for the four days, on a penalty of 12d per day apiece. All labourers were to provide their own equipment, and bound to work for eight hours each day upon the roads.

== Subsequent developments ==
Section 3 of the act provided that the act would expire at the end of the next parliamentary session, seven years from the start of the present parliamentary session. This provision was extended to run for another twenty years by the Highways Act 1562 (5 Eliz. 1. c. 13).

The whole act was repealed by section 57 of the Highways (No. 2) Act 1766 (7 Geo. 3. c. 42).
