= List of acts of the Parliament of England from 1555 =

This is a list of acts of the Parliament of England for the year 1555.

For acts passed during the period 1707–1800, see the list of acts of the Parliament of Great Britain. See also the list of acts of the Parliament of Scotland, and the list of acts of the Parliament of Ireland.

For acts passed from 1801 onwards, see the list of acts of the Parliament of the United Kingdom. For acts of the devolved parliaments and assemblies in the United Kingdom, see the list of acts of the Scottish Parliament, the list of acts of the Northern Ireland Assembly, and the list of acts and measures of Senedd Cymru; see also the list of acts of the Parliament of Northern Ireland.

For medieval statutes, etc. that are not considered to be acts of Parliament, see the list of English statutes.

See also the List of ordinances and acts of the Parliament of England, 1642–1660 for ordinances and acts passed by the Long Parliament and other bodies without royal assent, and which were not considered to be valid legislation following the Restoration in 1660.

The number shown after each act's title is its chapter number. Acts are cited using this number, preceded by the years of the reign during which the relevant parliamentary session was held; thus the Union with Ireland Act 1800 is cited as "39 & 40 Geo. 3. c. 67", meaning the 67th act passed during the session that started in the 39th year of the reign of George III and which finished in the 40th year of that reign. The modern convention is to use Arabic numerals in citations (thus "41 Geo. 3" rather than "41 Geo. III"). Acts of the last session of the Parliament of Great Britain and the first session of the Parliament of the United Kingdom are both cited as "41 Geo. 3".

Acts passed by the Parliament of England did not have a short title; however, some of these acts have subsequently been given a short title by acts of the Parliament of the United Kingdom, such as the Short Titles Act 1896 (59 & 60 Vict. c. 14).

Acts passed by the Parliament of England were deemed to have come into effect on the first day of the session in which they were passed. Because of this, the years given in the list below may in fact be the year before a particular act was passed.

== 2 & 3 Ph. & M. ==
The 2nd Parliament of King Philip and Queen Mary, which met from 21 October 1555 until 9 December 1555.

This session was also traditionally cited as 2 & 3 Phil. & Mary, 2 & 3 Phil. & Mar or 2 & 3 P. & M.

=== Public acts ===
Short title	Citation	Royal assent
Long title
Northern Borders Act 1555 (repealed)	2 & 3 Ph. & M. c. 1	9 December 1555
An Act for the re-edifying of Castles and Forts, and for inclosing of Grounds upon the Borders towards Scotland. (Repealed by Statute Law Revision Act 1863 (26 & 27 Vict. c. 125))
Tillage Act 1555 (repealed)	2 & 3 Ph. & M. c. 2	9 December 1555
An Act for the re edifying of decayed houses of husbandry and for the increase of tillage. (Repealed by Statute Law Revision Act 1863 (26 & 27 Vict. c. 125))
Increase of Cattle Act 1555 (repealed)	2 & 3 Ph. & M. c. 3	9 December 1555
An Act touching the keeping of Milch Kine, and the Breeding and Rearing of Calves. (Repealed by Repeal of Certain Laws Act 1772 (12 Geo. 3. c. 71))
First Fruits, etc. Act 1555 (repealed)	2 & 3 Ph. & M. c. 4	9 December 1555
An Act for the Extinguishment of the First Fruits, and touching Order and Disposition of the Tenths of Spiritual and Ecclesiastical Promotions, and of Rectories and Parsonages Impropriate, remaining in the Queen's Majesty's Hands. (Repealed by First Fruits and Tenths Act 1558 (1 Eliz. 1. c. 4))
Poor Act 1555 (repealed)	2 & 3 Ph. & M. c. 5	9 December 1555
An Act for the Relief of the Poor. (Repealed by Statute Law Revision Act 1863 (26 & 27 Vict. c. 125))
Purveyors Act 1555 (repealed)	2 & 3 Ph. & M. c. 6	9 December 1555
An Act against the excessive Taking of the Queen's Majesty's Purveyors. (Repealed by Statute Law Revision Act 1863 (26 & 27 Vict. c. 125))
Sale of Horses Act 1555 (repealed)	2 & 3 Ph. & M. c. 7	9 December 1555
An Act against the buying of stolen Horses. (Repealed by Criminal Law Act 1967 (c. 58))
Highways Act 1555 (repealed)	2 & 3 Ph. & M. c. 8	9 December 1555
An Act for the amending of Highways. (Repealed by Highways (No. 2) Act 1766 (7 Geo. 3. c. 42))
Gaming Act 1555 (repealed)	2 & 3 Ph. & M. c. 9	9 December 1555
An Act to make void divers Licences of Houses wherein unlawful Games be used. (Repealed by Statute Law Revision Act 1863 (26 & 27 Vict. c. 125))
Criminal Law Act 1555 (repealed)	2 & 3 Ph. & M. c. 10	9 December 1555
An Act to take Examination of Prisoners suspected of any Manslaughter or Felony. (Repealed by Criminal Law Act 1826 (7 Geo. 4. c. 64))
Weavers Act 1555 (repealed)	2 & 3 Ph. & M. c. 11	9 December 1555
An Act touching Weavers. (Repealed by Woollen Manufacture Act 1809 (49 Geo. 3. c. 109))
Cloths Act 1555 (repealed)	2 & 3 Ph. & M. c. 12	9 December 1555
An Act for the viewing and sealing of Cloths, commonly called Bridgewaters. (Repealed by Woollen Manufacture Act 1809 (49 Geo. 3. c. 109))
Buying of Wool (Halifax) Act 1555 (repealed)	2 & 3 Ph. & M. c. 13	9 December 1555
An Act for the Inhabitants of Halifax, touching the buying of Wools. (Repealed by Statute Law Revision Act 1863 (26 & 27 Vict. c. 125))
Rebuilding of Mills near Hereford Act 1555 (repealed)	2 & 3 Ph. & M. c. 14	9 December 1555
An Act for the re-edifying of Four Mills near the City of Hereforde. (Repealed by Statute Law Revision Act 1948 (11 & 12 Geo. 6. c. 62))
Purveyors Act 1555 (repealed)	2 & 3 Ph. & M. c. 15	9 December 1555
An Act that Purveyors shall not take Victuals within Five Miles of Cambridge and Oxforde. (Repealed by Statute Law Revision Act 1863 (26 & 27 Vict. c. 125))
Thames Watermen Act 1555 (repealed)	2 & 3 Ph. & M. c. 16	9 December 1555
An Act touching Watermen upon the River of Thames. (Repealed by Thames Watermen and Lightermen Act 1827 (7 & 8 Geo. 4. c. lxxv))
Benet Smythe Deprived of Benefit of Clergy Act 1555 (repealed)	2 & 3 Ph. & M. c. 17	9 December 1555
An Act to take away the Benefit of Clergy from Benet Smythe, for the Murder of one Rufforde. (Repealed by Statute Law Revision Act 1948 (11 & 12 Geo. 6. c. 62))
Commissioners of Peace in Boroughs Act 1555 (repealed)	2 & 3 Ph. & M. c. 18	9 December 1555
An Act touching Commissions of the Peace, and Gaol Delivery, in Towns Corporate, not being Counties. (Repealed by Statute Law Revision Act 1887 (50 & 51 Vict. c. 59))
Powdyke in Marshland (Malicious Injury a Felony) Act 1555 (repealed)	2 & 3 Ph. & M. c. 19	9 December 1555
An Act touching Powdyke in Marsh-lands. (Repealed by Statute Law Revision Act 1948 (11 & 12 Geo. 6. c. 62))
Duchy of Lancaster Act 1555	2 & 3 Ph. & M. c. 20	9 December 1555
An Act for the enlarging of the Dutchy of Lancaster.
Continuance of Laws Act 1555 (repealed)	2 & 3 Ph. & M. c. 21	9 December 1555
An Act for the Continuance of certain Acts. (Repealed by Statute Law Revision Act 1863 (26 & 27 Vict. c. 125))
Taxation Act 1555 (repealed)	2 & 3 Ph. & M. c. 22	9 December 1555
An Act for the Confirmation of a Subsidy granted by the Clergy. (Repealed by Statute Law Revision Act 1863 (26 & 27 Vict. c. 125))
Taxation (No. 2) Act 1555 (repealed)	2 & 3 Ph. & M. c. 23	9 December 1555
An Act of a Subsidy and Two Fifteenths and Tenths, granted by the Temporalty. (Repealed by Statute Law Revision Act 1863 (26 & 27 Vict. c. 125))

=== Private acts ===
Short title	Citation	Royal assent
Long title
Duke of Norfolk's Estate Act 1555	2 & 3 Ph. & M. c. 1 Pr.	9 December 1555
An Act, That the Duke of Norff. by the Advice of the Lord Chancellor, the Earl of Arundell, and the Bishop of Elye, may make Sales and Grants during his Minority.
Restitution of Sir Edward Nevill's Heirs Act 1555	2 & 3 Ph. & M. c. 2 Pr.	9 December 1555
An Act for the Restitution of the Heirs Male of Sir Edward Nevyll, Knight.

=== Sources ===
- "2° & 3° Phil. & Mar.". The Statutes of the Realm. Vol. 4 Part 1: 1547 to 1584. pp. 265–312 – via Internet Archive.
- "2° & 3° Phil. & Mar.". The Statutes of the Realm. Vol. 4 Part 1: 1547 to 1584. pp. 265–312 – via HathiTrust.
- "2° & 3° Phil. & Mar.". The Statutes of the Realm. Vol. 4 Part 1: 1547 to 1584. pp. 265–312 – via Google Books.
- Pickering, Danby, ed. (1763). "Anno secundo & tertio Philippi & Mariæ". The Statutes at Large. Vol. 6: from the First Year of Queen Mary to the Thirty-fifth Year of Queen Elizabeth, inclusive. Cambridge: Joseph Bentham. pp. 66–90 – via Internet Archive.
- Pickering, Danby, ed. (1763). "Anno secundo & tertio Philippi & Mariæ". The Statutes at Large. Vol. 6: from the First Year of Queen Mary to the Thirty-fifth Year of Queen Elizabeth, inclusive. Cambridge: Joseph Bentham. pp. 66–90 – via Internet Archive.
- Journal of the House of Commons. Vol. 1 – 1547-1629. His Majesty's Stationery Office. 1802 – via British History Online.
- Journal of the House of Lords. Vol. 1: 1509-1577. London: His Majesty's Stationery Office. 1830 – via British History Online.
- Chronological Table of and Index to the Statutes. Vol. 1: To the End of the Session 59 Vict. Sess. 2 (1895) (13th ed.). London: Her Majesty's Stationery Office. 1896. p. 58 – via Google Books.
- Chronological Table of the Statutes: Covering the Period from 1235 to the End of 1971. London: Her Majesty's Stationery Office. 1972. p. 55. ISBN 978-0-11-840096-1 – via Google Books.
- "Chronological Tables of the Private and Personal Acts: Part 1 (1539–1601)". legislation.gov.uk. The National Archives.

== See also ==
- List of acts of the Parliament of England
