= General Griffith =

General Griffith may refer to:

- Richard Griffith (general) (1814–1862), Confederate States Army brigadier general
- Ronald H. Griffith (1936–2018), U.S. Army four-star general
- Samuel B. Griffith (1906–1983), U.S. Marine Corps brigadier general

== See also ==
- Charles Griffiths (British Army officer) (1763–1829), British Army lieutenant general
- Thomas Griffiths (general) (1865–1947), Australian Army brigadier general
- Attorney General Griffith (disambiguation)
