= William Neville Hart =

British banker, politician and diplomat

William Neville Hart (27 December 1741 in St James's Palace, London – 23 October 1804, Inveraray Castle, Scotland) was a British banker, politician and diplomat. He was born to Denise Gougeon, the wife of Lewis Augustus Blondeau. His mother was the Under Housekeeper or Mistress of the King's Household, a position she was to hold for more than fifty years. Denise was the sister of Esther Gougeon, the wife of Daniel Cornelius de Beaufort. Hart's father held various positions at Court including that of Gentleman Usher to King George II.

== Marriages ==
Blondeau's Name Act 1765
- Act of Parliament
- Parliament of Great Britain
- Long title: An Act to enable William Nevil Blondeau Esquire and his. Issue to take and use the Surname of Hart.
- Citation: 5 Geo. 3. c. 17 Pr.
- Territorial extent: Great Britain

Dates
- Royal assent: 22 March 1765
- Commencement: 10 January 1765 (Note: Start of session.)

Status: Current legislation

Following the death of his father, and the remarriage of his mother to Sir William Hart Kt., a banker and Sheriff of London, William Neville Blondeau took the surname of Hart by private act of Parliament, Blondeau's Name Act 1765 (5 Geo. 3. c. 17 Pr.) of 22 March 1765. Hart had married firstly on 7 January 1765 Elizabeth, daughter of Sir Cæsar Hawkins, 1st Baronet (1711–1786), serjeant-surgeon to the King, and grandfather of Caesar Hawkins, in turn serjeant-surgeon to Queen Victoria. Elizabeth, unfortunately, died on 30 October 1766 s.p.

He married secondly Elizabeth Aspinwall. Her father was Stanhope Aspinwall, who on his mother's side, was a great great-grandson of Philip Stanhope, 1st Earl of Chesterfield. Aspinwall was a diplomat who had served in Constantinople and Algiers and at the time of his death in 1771 was Secretary to Earl Harcourt, Ambassador to France. Aspinwall's wife was named Magdalena, but little else appears to be known of her.

== Career in England ==
Hart entered the banking firm of Blackwell, Hart, Darrell, and Croft, of Pall Mall. Hart entered the House of Commons for Stafford on 12 April 1770, apparently without opposition, on what interest it is not known. He took the degree of D.C.L. from Oxford University in 1772. In the House of Commons, Hart made seven speeches, one notably on the proposed Royal Marriages Act 1772; he spoke for the Court. Another dealt with the appointment of Oliver over the printer's case. He did not stand in 1774.

== The Continent ==
After leaving Parliament in 1774, Hart travelled extensively on the Continent, France, Italy, Germany and the northern courts. He went to Poland where he became Chamberlain to Stanislaus Augustus Poniatowski, the last king of Poland. On 27 December 1794, Hart was created knight of the Order of Saint Stanislaus. King Stanislaus also conferred on him the Order of the White Eagle.

== Back in England ==
Hart returned to England the following year and in October received a letter from the Duke of Portland to the effect that King George III had authorised him wear the Orders given to him. Even though he was thereafter called Sir William Neville Hart, it is not clear whether the King's authorisation went as far as that. He also had the honour of kissing the hands of both the King and of Queen Charlotte as a mark of special favour. While on the Continent, Hart had kept extensive journals, but they were destroyed with other possessions in the 1802 fire at Roseneath Castle, the seat of the Duke of Argyll.

== Death ==
Hart's second wife, the daughter of Stanhope Aspinwall, apparently had died in 1783 and, according to The Gentleman's Magazine, at St Bemain de Colboe, Normandy. It is possible that it was in fact St-Romain-de-Colbosc in Normandy.

The death certificate of Hart's wife, Elizabeth Aspinwall, can be found in the Archives of Seine Maritime. She died on 12 October 1783 in Gommerville, Seine Maritime, Normandy, where she was living at the time. She was in the 38th year of her life and died of a fever.; her tombstone can be seen in the park around the castle of Filières with the epitaph : ici repose sous la garde de l'amitié Elisabeth Aspinwal mariée à Guillaume Nevil Hart membre du parlement d'Angleterre morte à 34 ans le 12 octobre 1783 également distinguée par son esprit et sa beauté des Français ont élevé ce monument à la mémoire de cette angloise; a painting of Elisabeth Aspinwal can be seen in the castle of Filières

On 23 October 1804, Hart died at Inveraray Castle, owned by the Duke of Argyll,

== Children and issue ==
Hart and Elizabeth, the daughter of Stanhope Aspinwall, had two sons and four daughters:-

- William Stanhope Hart, born 17 October 1769 and baptised 14 November at St James's Church, Piccadilly, died in his father's lifetime.
- William Neville Hart, sometime Captain in the then 79th Cameron Highlanders, was born 19 July 1772 and baptised 12 August also at St James's Church, Piccadilly. He was the father of Reverend Henry Cornelius Hart, presumably the H. C. Hart mentioned in the References.
- Elizabeth Hart, born 28 August 1768 and baptised 28 September at St James Church, Piccadilly, married on 4 June 1787 Dr John Griffiths, surgeon to Queen Charlotte's Household from 1792 to 1818, the parents of George Richard Griffiths and the grandparents of George Neville Griffiths M.L.A. The latter was the grandfather of William Charles Wentworth M.P. (1907–2003).
- Louisa Alexandrina Hart, born 20 December 1770 and baptised 7 January 1771 at St James Church, Piccadilly, married Lieutenant–Colonel George Lyon. Their elder son, Captain George Francis Lyon R.N., the Arctic and African explorer in turn married Lucy Louisa, younger daughter of the Irish revolutionary, Lord Edward Fitzgerald.
- Sophia Hart, born 11 November 1773 and baptised 13 December, married 14 December 1795 Richard Newton Bennett.
- Caroline Frances Hart, born 1 February 1775t, married Dr Griffiths' younger brother, Lieutenant–General Charles Griffiths (born 3 August 1763), the foster brother to Prince Frederick, Duke of York and Albany (born 16 August 1763).

A third son with Elisabeth Aspinwall, Francis, not identified above, was buried in Gommerville, Seine Maritime, France on 25 August 1779 aged about 3 years old. In the Parish records it states of the father "Guillaume Nevil' Hart gentilhomme anglois et Cy devant membre du parlement d'angleterre..." The mother is recorded as Elisabeth Aspinwall and their religion "religion pretendue reformee" – Protestants.

== Bibliography ==
- Plantagenet Roll of the Blood Royal: The Isabel of Essex Volume, Containing the Descendants of Isabel (Plantagenet), Countess of Essex & Eu by Ruvigny and Raineval Staff published by Genealogical Publishing Com, 1994; pp. 515 and 516.
- Oxford Journals: Notes and Queries:
  - Blondeau: Gougeon; F.C.H.: 2nd S VI, 156, 25 Dec.. 1858 p. 534
  - Order of St. Stanislaus: Sir William Neville Hart; H.C.Hart; 2nd S VI, 139, 28 Aug.. 1858 pp. 162 and 163
  - Sir William Neville Hart and his Descendants; Frederick Copland-Griffiths; 10 S. X. 3 Oct.. 1908 pp. 263 and 264
  - Stanhope Aspinwall; Frederick Copland-Griffiths; 10 S. VI. 15 December 1906 pp. 473 and 474

Parliament of Great Britain
Preceded by 3rd Viscount Chetwynd; Richard Whitworth	Member of Parliament for Stafford; 1770–1774; With: Richard Whitworth	Succeeded by Hugo Meynell; Richard Whitworth
