= Customs, etc. Act 1765 =

Act of the Parliament of Great Britain

- Act of Parliament
- Parliament of Great Britain
- Long title: An Act for more effectually securing and encouraging the Trade of His Majesty's American Dominions; for repealing the Inland Duty on Coffee, imposed by an Act made in the Thirty-second Year of His late Majesty King George the Second, and for granting an Inland Duty on all Coffee imported (except Coffee of the Growth of the British Dominions in America); for altering the Bounties and Drawbacks upon Sugars exported; for repealing Part of an Act made in the Twenty-third Year of His said late Majesty, whereby Bar Iron made in the said Dominions was prohibited to be exported from Great Britain or carried coastwise; and for regulating the Fees of the Officers of the Customs in the said Dominions.
- Citation: 5 Geo. 3. c. 45
- Territorial extent: England and Wales; Scotland

Dates
- Royal assent: 25 May 1765
- Commencement: 1 January 1766 (Note: Section 1.)
- Repealed: 5 July 1825
Other legislation
Amends	Colonial Trade Act 1763
Amended by	Continuance of Laws Act 1774; Continuance of Laws, etc. Act 1774
Repealed by	Customs Law Repeal Act 1825
Relates to	Iron Act; Navigation Acts

Status: Repealed

Text of statute as originally enacted

The Customs, etc. Act 1765 (5 Geo. 3. c. 45), also known as the Customs Act, the Duties Act, or the American Act, was an act of the Parliament of Great Britain. The act aimed to encourage imports to Great Britain from its American dominions, under the system of Trade and Navigation Acts. The act encouraged the import of timber products; repealed the inland duty on coffee, imposed in 1758; imposed an inland duty on all coffee imported from foreign sources; altered the existing bounties and drawbacks on sugar exports; repealed part of the Iron Act, which prohibited bar iron made in the colonies from being exported from Great Britain, or carried along its coast; and regulated the fees of the customs officers in the colonies.

Specifically mentioned in the preamble were "deals, planks, boards and timbers" for so that the "Royal Navy... may be furnished with such materials at more reasonable rates, and great sums of money at present expended among foreign nations, for the purchase of such materials, may be saved." The act goes on to enumerate the several sums payable as reward or premium directly to the merchants.

The encouragement of the coffee trade with the American dominions was in the act similarly promoted. From section 14 to section 18 the act promoted the sugar trade; between section 19 and 21 the rice trade; sections 22 and 23 promoted the iron trade.

== Subsequent developments ==
So much of the act "which gave liberty to export rice from North Carolina, in the same manner, and under the like duties, securities, restrictions, regulations, limitations, duties, penalties, and forfeitures, as the Colonial Trade Act 1763 (4 Geo. 3. c. 27) with respect to carrying rice to South Carolina and Georgia was continued from the expiration of that enactment to the end of the next session of parliament after 24 June 1781 by section 2 of the Continuance of Laws Act 1774 (14 Geo. 3. c. 67).

So much of the act "as relates to the regulating the Fees of the Officers of the Customs in America, and for extending the same to the Naval Officers there", was continued from the expiration of that enactment to the end of the next session of parliament after 29 September 1778 by section 12 of the Continuance of Laws, etc. Act 1774 (14 Geo. 3. c. 86).

The whole act was repealed by section 117 of the Customs Law Repeal Act 1825 (6 Geo. 4. c. 105), which came into force on 5 July 1825.
