= Étainhus =

- Commune
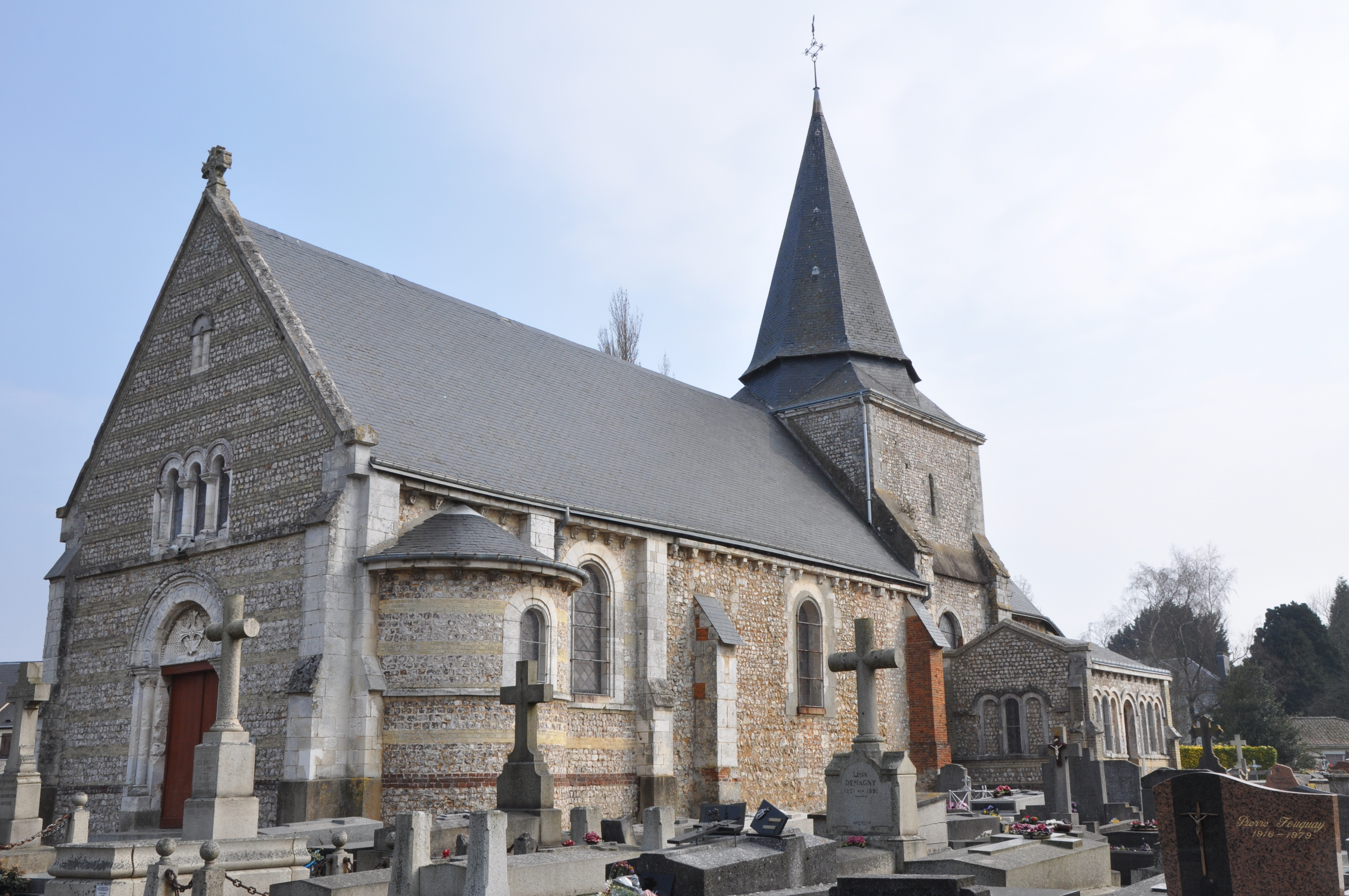
- The church in Étainhus

- Coat of arms
- Location of Étainhus
- Location within France Location within Normandy
- Coordinates: 49°34′05″N 0°18′49″E
- Country: France
- Region: Normandy
- Department: Seine-Maritime
- Arrondissement: Le Havre
- Canton: Saint-Romain-de-Colbosc
- Intercommunality: Le Havre Seine Métropole

Government
  - Mayor (2020–2026): Rémi Malo
- Area^{1}: 8.22 km^{2} (3.17 sq mi)
- Elevation: 106 m (348 ft)
- Highest elevation: 126 m (413 ft)
- Lowest elevation: 87 m (285 ft)
- Population (2023): 1,207
  - Density: 147/km^{2} (380/sq mi)
- Time zone: UTC+01:00 (CET)
  - Summer (DST): UTC+02:00 (CEST)
- INSEE/Postal code: 76250 /76430
- ^{1} French Land Register data, which excludes lakes, ponds, glaciers > 1 km^{2} (0.386 sq mi or 247 acres) and river estuaries.

Étainhus (French pronunciation: [etɛ̃.y]) is a commune in the Seine-Maritime department in the Normandy region in northern France.

== Heraldry ==
Arms of Étainhus	The arms of Étainhus are blazoned : Gules, a chevron Or masoned sable between 2 escallops Or and 2 keys in saltire argent, and on a chief Or a drakkar sable.

== Geography ==
Étainhus is a farming village in the Pays de Caux, situated some 10 miles (16 km) northeast of Le Havre, at the junction of the D234 and D39 roads.

== Population ==
Historical population
Year	Pop.	±% p.a.
1968	531	—
1975	542	+0.29%
1982	609	+1.68%
1990	926	+5.38%
1999	1,007	+0.94%
2007	1,050	+0.52%
2012	1,081	+0.58%
2017	1,160	+1.42%
2023	1,207	+0.66%
Source: INSEE

== Places of interest ==
- The church of St. Jacques, dating from the eleventh century.

== See also ==
- Tramway de Saint-Romain-de-Colbosc
- Communes of the Seine-Maritime department
