= George Richard Griffiths =

George Richard Griffiths (25 March 1802 – 7 August 1859) was an English-born merchant and banker, who spent much of his life in the then Colony of New South Wales.

== In Australia ==
Griffiths was born in London, the son of Dr. John Griffiths, one-time surgeon to Queen Charlotte's Household, and Elizabeth, daughter of Sir William Neville Hart. He arrived in Sydney on 5 June 1839 on board the Mellish to take up a new position with the Bank of Australasia. Earlier in 1835, he had been appointed London secretary of the Bank of Australasia. He left the Bank of Australasia in 1839 and began business as a merchant and commission agent under the name of Griffiths, Gore & Co., and later Griffiths, Fanning & Co. By 1843 he was a local director of the Union Bank of Australia. He acquired a licence to depasture stock beyond the limits of Portland Bay, a small bay off the coast of Victoria, about 360 kilometres (220 mi) west of Melbourne. His firm owned Wooroowoolgen station on the Richmond River in Northern New South Wales; it spread over a large area, almost to the Queensland border. He also had original shares in the Colonial Sugar Refining Co, now CSR Limited. His opinion was often sought by select committees of the legislature on financial matters, such as the debenture bill in 1841, and in 1843 on the causes of the depression, which he claimed arose from over-speculation through excessive bank loans. He declined nomination to the Legislative Council as representative for Melbourne. He returned to England in 1853 and died in 1859 at Castle Hill, Englefield Green.

== Marriage and family ==
On 10 December 1836 in England, Griffiths married Letitia, daughter of Samuel Chatfield and Anne Storrow. They had eight sons and three daughters:-

- Frederick Close, b. 9 September 1838 m. 12 August 1873 Annette Agnes Willis and were was the parents of Gwendolin Winifred b. 4 August 1886 and Glynde Nesta b. 4 July 1889, two minor social celebrities in Sydney
- George Neville, M.L.A., b. 23 January 1840
- Charles Cecil, b. 9 January 1842
- William Russell, b. 14 May 1845
- Algernon Sydney, Lieutenant Colonel and Brevet Colonel, b. 23 May 1847
- Stanley, b. 3 February 1849
- Llewellyn, b. 27 August 1851
- Herbert Tyrrell, b. 10 August 1853
- Rose Mary Anne, b. 4 November 1837
- Letitia Frances, b. 15 August 1843
- Ada Blanche, b. 26 March 1855
