= John Griffiths (surgeon) =

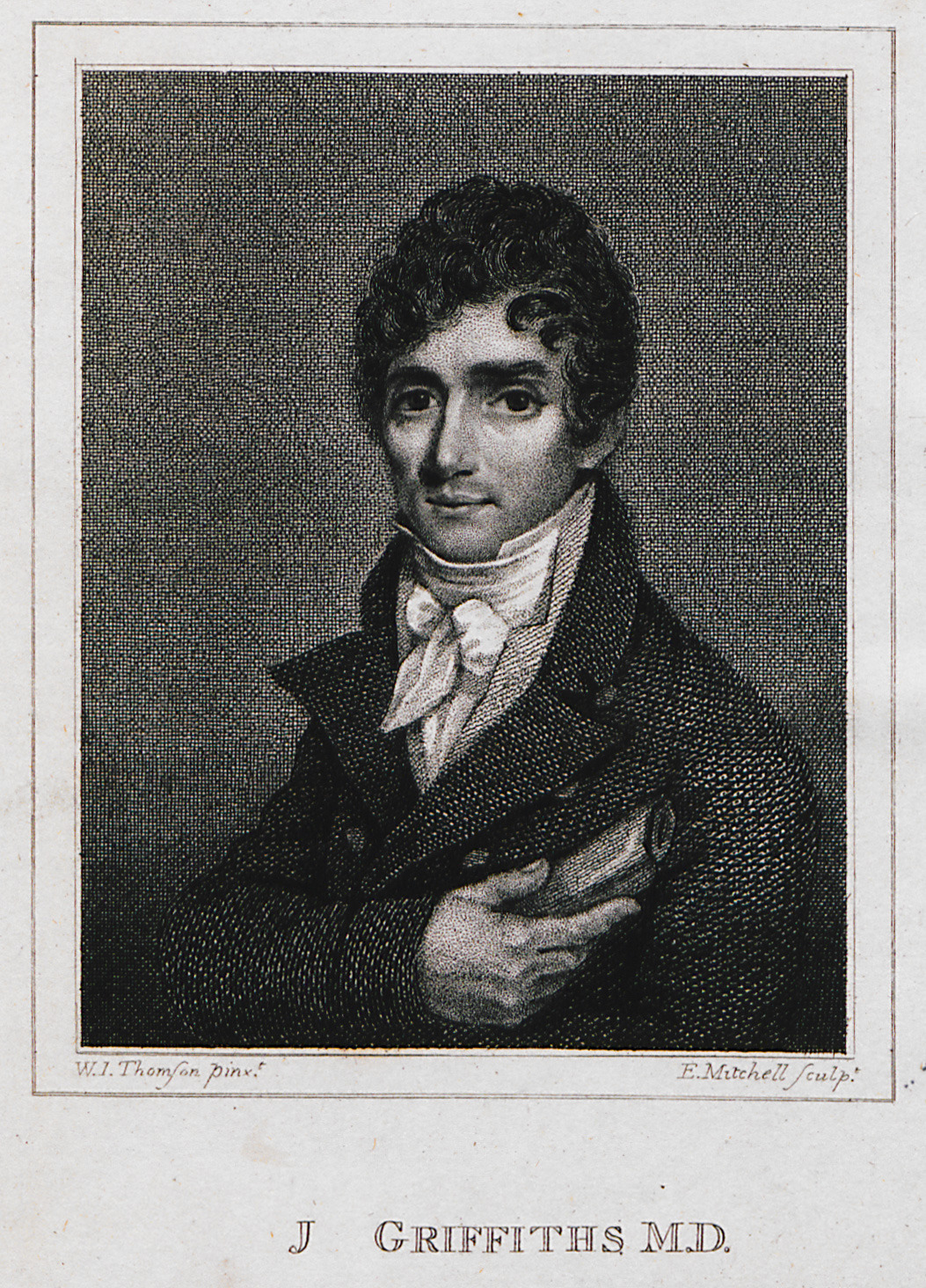
Griffiths in a 1805 print

John Griffiths of Erryd (28 October 1754 – 17 September 1822) was a London medical practitioner and surgeon. His parents were the Reverend John Griffiths, B.A. from Oxford University, and Mary Denham.

== Career ==
Dr Griffiths was appointed surgeon to Queen Charlotte's Household on 28 March 1789, and held this position until her death in 1818 (following which he attended her funeral in St George's Chapel, Windsor Castle). He was also surgeon at St George's Hospital in London from 1796 until 1822.

Griffiths was among those who gave evidence to the 1802 Committee of the House of Commons on Dr JENNER'S Petition respecting his Discovery of Vaccine Inoculation against small pox, recently discovered by Edward Jenner. It was reported he testified that he had "inoculated upward to fifteen hundred persons, none of whom has had untoward symptoms, among them three of his own children, at various periods within three years."

== Marriage, family and death ==
Griffiths married Elizabeth, the daughter of Sir William Neville Hart M.P. and Elizabeth Aspinwall, on 4 June 1787 and had issue. He died on 17 September 1822 in Charmouth, Dorset, where he had "retired for the sake of his health". His wife died on 16 April 1824, and is buried with her husband in the graveyard of St Andrew's Parish Church. He was the elder brother of Lieutenant-General Charles Griffiths. His younger brother's wife, Caroline, was the sister of his own wife. Griffiths and his wife, Elizabeth, were the parents of George Richard Griffiths and the grandparents of George Neville Griffiths M.L.A (New South Wales). The latter was the grandfather of Wiliam Charles Wentworth IV M.P (Australia).
