= List of acts of the Parliament of Great Britain from 1765 =

This is a complete list of acts of the Parliament of Great Britain for the year 1765.

For acts passed until 1707, see the list of acts of the Parliament of England and the list of acts of the Parliament of Scotland. See also the list of acts of the Parliament of Ireland.

For acts passed from 1801 onwards, see the list of acts of the Parliament of the United Kingdom. For acts of the devolved parliaments and assemblies in the United Kingdom, see the list of acts of the Scottish Parliament, the list of acts of the Northern Ireland Assembly, and the list of acts and measures of Senedd Cymru; see also the list of acts of the Parliament of Northern Ireland.

The number shown after each act's title is its chapter number. Acts are cited using this number, preceded by the year(s) of the reign during which the relevant parliamentary session was held; thus the Union with Ireland Act 1800 is cited as "39 & 40 Geo. 3. c. 67", meaning the 67th act passed during the session that started in the 39th year of the reign of George III and which finished in the 40th year of that reign. Note that the modern convention is to use Arabic numerals in citations (thus "41 Geo. 3" rather than "41 Geo. III"). Acts of the last session of the Parliament of Great Britain and the first session of the Parliament of the United Kingdom are both cited as "41 Geo. 3".

Acts passed by the Parliament of Great Britain did not have a short title; however, some of these acts have subsequently been given a short title by acts of the Parliament of the United Kingdom (such as the Short Titles Act 1896).

Before the Acts of Parliament (Commencement) Act 1793 came into force on 8 April 1793, acts passed by the Parliament of Great Britain were deemed to have come into effect on the first day of the session in which they were passed. Because of this, the years given in the list below may in fact be the year before a particular act was passed.

== 5 Geo. 3 ==
The fourth session of the 12th Parliament of Great Britain, which met from 10 January 1765 until 25 May 1765.

This session was also traditionally cited as 5 G. 3.

=== Public acts ===
Short title	Citation	Royal assent
Long title
Importation Act 1765 (repealed)	5 Geo. 3. c. 1	28 January 1765
An Act for Importation of Salted Beef, Pork, Bacon, and Butter, from Ireland, for a limited Time. (Repealed by Customs Law Repeal Act 1825 (6 Geo. 4. c. 105))
Malt, etc. Duties Act 1765 (repealed)	5 Geo. 3. c. 2	11 February 1765
An Act for continuing, and granting to His Majesty, certain Duties on Malt, Mum, Cyder, and Perry, for the Service of the Year One Thousand Seven Hundred and Sixty-five. (Repealed by Statute Law Revision Act 1867 (30 & 31 Vict. c. 59))
Importation (No. 2) Act 1765 (repealed)	5 Geo. 3. c. 3	11 February 1765
An Act for extending the Time granted by an Act passed in the Third Year of the Reign of His present Majesty, (Note: Supply, etc. Act 176 (3 Geo. 3. c. 17)) for allowing His Majesty's Subjects to import their Goods and Effects, being the Produce of certain Places ceded to France and Spain by the late Treaty of Peace, (Note: This was the Treaty of Paris (1763).) upon Payment of the same Duties as they would have been liable to if the same Places had remained in His Majesty's Possession. (Repealed by Statute Law Revision Act 1867 (30 & 31 Vict. c. 59))
Indemnity Act 1765 (repealed)	5 Geo. 3. c. 4	11 February 1765
An Act to indemnify such Persons as have omitted to qualify themselves for Offices and Employments; and to indemnify Justices of the Peace, Deputy Lieutenants, Officers of the Militia, or others, who have omitted to register or deliver in their Qualifications within the Time limited by Law; and for giving further Time for those Purposes. (Repealed by Statute Law Revision Act 1867 (30 & 31 Vict. c. 59))
Land Tax Act 1765 (repealed)	5 Geo. 3. c. 5	11 February 1765
An Act for granting an Aid to His Majesty, by a Land Tax, to be raised in Great Britain, for the Service of the Year One Thousand Seven Hundred and Sixty-five. (Repealed by Statute Law Revision Act 1867 (30 & 31 Vict. c. 59))
Marine Mutiny Act 1765 (repealed)	5 Geo. 3. c. 6	22 March 1765
An Act for the Regulation of His Majesty's Marine Forces while on Shore. (Repealed by Statute Law Revision Act 1867 (30 & 31 Vict. c. 59))
Mutiny Act 1765 (repealed)	5 Geo. 3. c. 7	22 March 1765
An Act for punishing Mutiny and Desertion, and for the better Payment of the Army and their Quarters. (Repealed by Statute Law Revision Act 1867 (30 & 31 Vict. c. 59))
Small Debts, Blackheath, etc. Act 1765 (repealed)	5 Geo. 3. c. 8	22 March 1765
An Act for the more easy and speedy Recovery of small Debts, within the Hundreds of Blackheath, of Bromley and Beckenham, of Rokesley otherwise Ruxley, and of Little and Lessness, in the County of Kent. (Repealed by Surrey and Kent Courts of Request Act 1836 (6 & 7 Will. 4. c. cxx))
Small Debts, Chippenham Act 1765 (repealed)	5 Geo. 3. c. 9	22 March 1765
An Act for the more easy and speedy Recovery of small Debts, within the Hundreds of Chippenham, Calne, and Damerham North, and Lordship or Liberty of Corsham, in the County of Wilts. (Repealed by County Courts Act 1846 (9 & 10 Vict. c. 95))
Importation (No. 3) Act 1765 (repealed)	5 Geo. 3. c. 10	22 March 1765
An Act to permit the free Importation of Cattle from Ireland. (Repealed by Customs Law Repeal Act 1825 (6 Geo. 4. c. 105))
Discovery of Longitude at Sea Act 1765 (repealed)	5 Geo. 3. c. 11	22 March 1765
An Act for rendering more effectual an Act made in the Twelfth Year of the Reign of Her late Majesty Queen Anne, intituled, "An Act for providing a publick Reward for such Person or Persons as shall discover the Longitude at Sea," (Note: Discovery of Longitude at Sea Act 1713 (13 Ann. c. 14)) with regard to the making Experiments of Proposals made for discovering the Longitude. (Repealed by Statute Law Revision Act 1867 (30 & 31 Vict. c. 59))
Duties in American Colonies Act 1765 or the Stamp Act 1765 (repealed)	5 Geo. 3. c. 12	22 March 1765
An Act for granting and applying certain Stamp Duties, and other Duties, in the British Colonies and Plantations in America, towards further defraying the Expenses of defending, protecting, and securing, the same; and for amending such Parts of the several Acts of Parliament, relating to the Trade and Revenues of the said Colonies and Plantations, as direct the Manner of determining and recovering the Penalties and Forfeitures therein mentioned. (Repealed by Duties in American Colonies Act 1766 (6 Geo. 3. c. 11))
Westminster Streets Act 1765 (repealed)	5 Geo. 3. c. 13	22 March 1765
An Act for empowering the Commissioners for putting in Execution the several Acts passed for paving, cleansing, and lighting, the Squares, Streets, and Lanes, within the City and Liberty of Westminster, and Parts adjacent, to collect certain Tolls on Sundays upon the several Roads therein mentioned, and apply the same for the Purposes of the said Acts. (Repealed by Statute Law Revision Act 1948 (11 & 12 Geo. 6. c. 62))
Preservation of Fish and Conies Act 1765 (repealed)	5 Geo. 3. c. 14	19 April 1765
An Act for the more effectual Preservation of Fish in Fish Ponds and other Waters, and Conies in Warrens; and for preventing the Damage done to Sea Banks within the County of Lincoln, by the breeding Conies therein. (Repealed for England and Wales by Criminal Statutes Repeal Act 1827 (7 & 8 Geo. 4. c. 27) and for India by Criminal Law (India) Act 1828 (9 Geo. 4. c. 74))
Enlargement of Times for Executing Acts, 1765 (repealed)	5 Geo. 3. c. 15	24 April 1765
An Act for enlarging the Times limited for executing and performing several Provisions, Powers, and Directions, in certain Acts of this Session of Parliament. (Repealed by Statute Law Revision Act 1867 (30 & 31 Vict. c. 59))
National Debt Act 1765 (repealed)	5 Geo. 3. c. 16	10 May 1765
An Act for altering the Times of Payment of certain Annuities established by Two Acts, made in the Thirty-third Year of the Reign of His late Majesty, (Note: Malt Duties, etc. Act 1759 (33 Geo. 2. c. 7)) and in the Second Year of the Reign of His present Majesty. (Note: National Debt (No. 2) Act 1761 (2 Geo. 3. c. 10)) (Repealed by Statute Law Revision Act 1870 (33 & 34 Vict. c. 69))
Ecclesiastical Leases Act 1765 (repealed)	5 Geo. 3. c. 17	24 April 1765
An Act to confirm all Leases already made, by Archbishops and Bishops, and other Ecclesiastical Persons, of Tithes and other Incorporeal Hereditaments, for One, Two, or Three, Life or Lives, or Twenty-one Years; and to enable them to grants such Leases, and to bring Actions of Debt for Recovery of Rents reserved, and in Arrear, on Leases for Life or Lives. (Repealed by Statute Law (Repeals) Act 1971 (c. 52))
Cultivation of Madder Act 1765 (repealed)	5 Geo. 3. c. 18	10 May 1765
An Act for continuing an Act made in the Thirty-first Year of His late Majesty's Reign, (Note: Madder Act 1757 (31 Geo. 2. c. 12)) for encouraging the Growth and Cultivation of Madder in that Part of Great Britain called England, by ascertaining the Tithe thereof. (Repealed by Statute Law Revision Act 1867 (30 & 31 Vict. c. 59))
Unfunded Debt Act 1765 (repealed)	5 Geo. 3. c. 19	10 May 1765
An Act for raising a certain Sum of Money, by Loans or Exchequer Bills, for the Service of the Year One Thousand Seven Hundred and Sixty-five. (Repealed by Statute Law Revision Act 1867 (30 & 31 Vict. c. 59))
Discovery of Longitude at Sea (No. 2) Act 1765 (repealed)	5 Geo. 3. c. 20	10 May 1765
An Act for explaining and rendering more effectual Two Acts, One, made in the Twelfth Year of the Reign of Queen Anne, intituled, "An Act for providing a publick Reward for such Person or Persons as shall discover the Longitude at Sea;" and the other, in the Twenty-sixth Year of the Reign of King George the Second, (Note: Discovery of Longitude at Sea Act 1753 (26 Geo. 2. c. 25)) intituled, "An Act to render more effectual an Act made in the Twelfth Year of the Reign of Her late Majesty Queen Anne, intituled, 'An Act for providing a publick Reward for such Person or Persons as shall discover the Longitude at Sea,' with regard to the making Experiments of Proposals made for discovering the Longitude; and to enlarge the Number of Commissioners for putting in Execution the said Act." (Repealed by Statute Law Revision Act 1867 (30 & 31 Vict. c. 59))
Land Tax (Commissioners) Act 1765 (repealed)	5 Geo. 3. c. 21	10 May 1765
An Act for appointing Commissioners to put in Execution an Act of this Session of Parliament, intituled, "An Act for granting an Aid to His Majesty, by a Land Tax, to be raised in Great Britain, for the Service of the Year One Thousand Seven Hundred and Sixty-five," (Note: Land Tax Act 1765 (5 Geo. 3. c. 5)) together with those named in the Two former Acts for appointing Commissioners of the Land Tax; and for indemnifying Persons who have acted as Commissioners of the Land Tax by virtue of Estates of or above a certain Value, though the same were not rated or assessed at the Value of One Hundred Pounds per Annum; and for limiting a Time, within which Suits and Prosecutions shall be commenced, with respect to the Qualifications of Persons who shall act as Commissioners of the Land Tax. (Repealed by Statute Law Revision Act 1867 (30 & 31 Vict. c. 59))
Herring Fishery Act 1765 (repealed)	5 Geo. 3. c. 22	10 May 1765
An Act for the further Encouragement of the British White Herring Fishery. (Repealed by Statute Law Revision Act 1867 (30 & 31 Vict. c. 59))
National Debt (No. 2) Act 1765 (repealed)	5 Geo. 3. c. 23	15 May 1765
An Act for granting Annuities, to be attended with a Lottery, to satisfy and discharge certain Navy, Victualing and Transport Bills; and for charging the Payment of such Annuities on the Sinking Fund. (Repealed by Statute Law Revision Act 1870 (33 & 34 Vict. c. 69))
Prize Money Act 1765 (repealed)	5 Geo. 3. c. 24	10 May 1765
An Act to oblige Agents for Prize-money to accompt for such Sums of Money as remain in their Hands unclaimed, the Property of any of His Majesty's Land Forces; and for the Application thereof. (Repealed by Statute Law Revision Act 1867 (30 & 31 Vict. c. 59))
Postage Act 1765 (repealed)	5 Geo. 3. c. 25	15 May 1765
An Act to alter certain Rates of Postage, and to amend, explain, and enlarge, several Provisions in an Act made in the Ninth Year of the Reign of Queen Anne, (Note: Post Office (Revenues) Act 1710 (9 Ann. c. 11)) and in other Acts relating to the Revenue of the Post-office. (Repealed by Statute Law Revision Act 1867 (30 & 31 Vict. c. 59))
Isle of Man Purchase Act 1765 (repealed)	5 Geo. 3. c. 26	10 May 1765
An Act for carrying into Execution a Contract made, pursuant to the Act of Parliament of the Twelfth of His late Majesty King George the First, between the Commissioners of His Majesty's Treasury and the Duke and Dutchess of Atholl, the Proprietors of the Isle of Man and their Trustees, for the Purchase of the said Island and its Dependencies, under certain Exceptions therein particularly mentioned. (Repealed by Statute Law (Repeals) Act 1976 (c. 16))
Minority of Heir to the Crown Act 1765 (repealed)	5 Geo. 3. c. 27	15 May 1765
An Act to provide for the Administration of the Government, in case the Crown should descend to any of the Children of His Majesty being under the Age of Eighteen Years, and for the Care and Guardianship of their Persons. (Repealed by Statute Law Revision Act 1867 (30 & 31 Vict. c. 59))
Court of Chancery Act 1765 (repealed)	5 Geo. 3. c. 28	15 May 1765
An Act to empower the High Court of Chancery to lay out, upon Government Securities, a Sum of Money therein mentioned, out of the Common and General Cash in the Bank of England belonging to the Suitors of the said Court; and to apply the Interest arising therefrom towards augmenting, the Income of the Masters of the said Court. (Repealed by Courts of Justice (Salaries and Funds) Act 1869 (32 & 33 Vict. c. 91))
Customs, etc. Act 1765 (repealed)	5 Geo. 3. c. 29	15 May 1765
An Act for repealing the Duties now payable upon Raw Silk imported, and for granting other Duties in Lieu thereof; for allowing a Drawback on the Exportation of Raw or Thrown Silk to Ireland; and for prohibiting the Exportation of Raw Silk from Ireland. (Repealed by Statute Law Revision Act 1867 (30 & 31 Vict. c. 59))
Customs, etc. (No. 2) Act 1765 (repealed)	5 Geo. 3. c. 30	15 May 1765
An Act for more effectually supplying the Export Trade of this Kingdom to Africa with such coarse printed Callicoes, and other Goods, of the Product or Manufacture of The East Indies, or other Places beyond the Cape of Good Hope, as are prohibited to be worn and used in Great Britain; for encouraging the Importation of Bugles into this Kingdom, for the better Supply of the Export Trade thereof; and for discontinuing the Bounty payable in Great Britain, and all Bounties and Allowances in Ireland, upon the Exportation of Corn, Grain, Malt, Meal, and Flour, from thence to the lsle of Man. (Repealed by Statute Law Revision Act 1867 (30 & 31 Vict. c. 59))
Customs, etc. Act 1765 (repealed)	5 Geo. 3. c. 31	25 May 1765
An Act to discontinue, for a limited Time, the Duties upon Wheat and Wheat Flour imported; and also the Bounty payable on the Exportation of Wheat and Wheat Flour. (Note: No bounty on export or duty on import of wheat until 24 August 1765.) (Repealed by Statute Law Revision Act 1867 (30 & 31 Vict. c. 59))
Customs, etc. Act 1765 (repealed)	5 Geo. 3. c. 32	25 May 1765
An Act to enable His Majesty, with the Advice of His Privy Council, to prohibit the Exportation of Wheat, Wheaten Meal, Flour, Bread, Biscuit, and Starch, during the next Recess of Parliament, at such Time, and in such Manner, as the Necessity of the Time may require, and He in His Wisdom shall think convenient and needful. (Repealed by Statute Law Revision Act 1867 (30 & 31 Vict. c. 59))
Mutiny, America Act 1765 or the Quartering Act 1765 (repealed)	5 Geo. 3. c. 33	15 May 1765
An Act to amend and render more effectual, in His Majesty’s Dominions in America, an Act passed in this present Session of Parliament intituled, "An Act for punishing Mutiny and Desertion, and for the better Payment of the Army and their Quarters." (Note: Mutiny Act 1765 (5 Geo. 3. c. 7)) (Repealed by Statute Law Revision Act 1867 (30 & 31 Vict. c. 59))
Militia Pay Act 1765 (repealed)	5 Geo. 3. c. 34	15 May 1765
An Act for applying the Money granted in this Session of Parliament, for defraying the Charge of the Pay and Cloathing of the Militia in that Part of Great Britain called England for One Year, beginning the Twenty-fifth Day of March One Thousand Seven Hundred and Sixty-five; and for punishing Militia Men for neglecting their Duty. (Repealed by Statute Law Revision Act 1867 (30 & 31 Vict. c. 59))
Stamp (No. 1) Act 1765 (repealed)	5 Geo. 3. c. 35	15 May 1765
An Act for granting to His Majesty certain Duties on the Exportation of Coals, and of several East India Goods, and upon Policies of Assurance; for retaining, upon the Exportation of White Callicoes and Mustins, a further Part of the Duties paid on the Importation thereof; and for obviating a Doubt with respect to Stamp Duties imposed upon Deeds by Two former Acts. (Note: Stamps Act 1713 (13 Ann. c. 18)) (Note: National Debt Act 1757 (30 Geo. 2. c. 19)) (Repealed by Inland Revenue Repeal Act 1870 (33 & 34 Vict. c. 99))
Militia Act 1765 (repealed)	5 Geo. 3. c. 36	25 May 1765
An Act to explain, amend, and enforce, the several Laws now in being, relating to the raising and training the Militia, within that Part of Great Britain called England. (Repealed by Statute Law Revision Act 1867 (30 & 31 Vict. c. 59))
Customs Act 1765 (repealed)	5 Geo. 3. c. 37	25 May 1765
An Act for laying certain Duties upon Gum Senegal and Gum Arabic, imported into, or exported from, Great Britain; and for confining the Exportation of Gum Senegal from Africa to Great Britain only. (Repealed by Customs Law Repeal Act 1825 (6 Geo. 4. c. 105))
Highways Act 1765 (repealed)	5 Geo. 3. c. 38	25 May 1765
An Act to continue Part of an Act made in the Thirtieth Year of the Reign of His late Majesty King George the Second, intituled, "An Act to render more effectual the several Laws now in being, for the Amendment and Preservation of the Publick Highways and Turnpike Roads of this Kingdom," (Note: Highways and Turnpike Roads (No. 2) Act 1757 (30 Geo. 2. c. 28)) and for making further Provision for the Preservation of the said Roads. (Repealed by Turnpike Roads Act 1766 (7 Geo. 3. c. 40))
Smuggling Act 1765 or the Mischief Act 1765 (repealed)	5 Geo. 3. c. 39	15 May 1765
An Act for more effectually preventing the Mischiefs arising to the Revenue and Commerce or Great Britain and Ireland, from the illicit and clandestine Trade to and from the Isle of Man. (Repealed by Customs Law Repeal Act 1825 (6 Geo. 4. c. 105))
Supply, etc. Act 1765 (repealed)	5 Geo. 3. c. 40	25 May 1765
An Act for granting to His Majesty a certain Sum of Money out of the Sinking Fund; for applying certain Monies, therein mentioned, for the Service of the Year One Thousand Seven Hundred and Sixty-five; for further appropriating the Supplies granted in this Session of Parliament; for allowing to the Receivers General of the Duties on Offices and Employments in Scotland a Reward for their Trouble; and for allowing further Time to such Persons as have omitted to make and file Affidavits of the Execution of Indentures of Clerks to Attornies and Solicitors. (Repealed by Statute Law Revision Act 1867 (30 & 31 Vict. c. 59))
Insolvent Debtors Relief Act 1765 (repealed)	5 Geo. 3. c. 41	25 May 1765
An Act for the Relief of Insolvent Debtors. (Repealed by Statute Law Revision Act 1867 (30 & 31 Vict. c. 59))
National Debt (No. 3) Act 1765 (repealed)	5 Geo. 3. c. 42	25 May 1765
An Act for redeeming One Fourth Part of the Joint Stock of Annuities, established by an Act made in the Third Year of His present Majesty's Reign, (Note: National Debt Act 1762 (3 Geo. 3. c. 9)) in respect of several Navy, victualing, and Transport Bills, and Ordnance Debentures. (Repealed by Statute Law Revision Act 1870 (33 & 34 Vict. c. 69))
Customs, etc., Revenues Act 1765 (repealed)	5 Geo. 3. c. 43	25 May 1765
An Act for the better securing, and further Improvement of the Revenues, of Customs, Excise, Inland, and Salt Duties; and for encouraging the Linen Manufacture of the Isle of Man; and for allowing the Importation of several Goods, the Produce and Manufacture of the said Island, under certain Restrictions and Regulations. (Repealed by Statute Law Revision Act 1867 (30 & 31 Vict. c. 59))
British Settlements in Africa, etc. Act 1764 or the Trade with Africa and Senegal Act (repealed)	5 Geo. 3. c. 44	25 May 1765
An Act for repealing the Act made in the last Session of Parliament, intituled, "An Act for vesting the Fort of Senegal and its Dependencies in the Company of Merchants trading to Africa;" (Note: Fort of Senegal Act 1763 (4 Geo. 3. c. 20)) and to vest as well the said Fort and its Dependencies, as all other the British Forts and Settlements upon the Coast of Africa lying between the Port of Sallee and Cape Rouge, together with all the Property, Estate, and Effects, of the Company of Merchants trading to Africa, in or upon the said Forts, Settlements, and their Dependencies, in His Majesty; and for securing, extending, and improving, the Trade to Africa. (Repealed by African Company Act 1783 (23 Geo. 3. c. 65))
Customs, etc. Act 1765 (repealed)	5 Geo. 3. c. 45	25 May 1765
An Act for more effectually securing and encouraging the Trade of His Majesty’s American Dominions; for repealing the Inland Duty on Coffee, imposed by an Act made in the Thirty-second Year of His late Majesty King George the Second; (Note: National Debt Act 1758 (32 Geo. 2. c. 10)) and for granting an Inland Duty on all Coffee imported (except Coffee of the Growth of the British Dominions in America); for altering the Bounties and Drawbacks upon Sugars exported; for repealing Part of an Act made in the Twenty-third Year of His said late Majesty, (Note: Importation, etc. Act 1749 (23 Geo. 2. c. 29)) whereby Bar Iron, made in the said Dominions, was prohibited to be exported from Great Britain, or carried Coastwise; and for regulating the Fees of the Officers of the Customs in the said Dominions. (Repealed by Customs Law Repeal Act 1825 (6 Geo. 4. c. 105))
Stamp (No. 2) Act 1765 (repealed)	5 Geo. 3. c. 46	25 May 1765
An Act for altering the Stamp Duties upon Admissions into Corporations or Companies; and for further securing and improving the Stamp Duties in Great Britain. (Repealed by Inland Revenue Repeal Act 1870 (33 & 34 Vict. c. 99))
Judges' Salaries Act 1765 (repealed)	5 Geo. 3. c. 47	25 May 1765
An Act for increasing the Fund for Payment of the Sums of Money directed, by an Act made in the Thirty-second Year of the Reign of His late Majesty King George the Second, (Note: Salaries of Judges Act 1758 (32 Geo. 2. c. 35)) to be applied in Augmentation of the Salaries of the Puisne Judges in the Court of King's Bench, the Judges in the Court of Common Pleas, the Barons of the Coif in the Court of Exchequer at Westminster, and the Justices of Chester, and the Great Sessions for the Counties in Wales, for the Time being; and for applying certain Sums in Augmentation of the Salaries of the said Judges and Justices, and of the Judges in the Courts of Session and Exchequer in Scotland, for a certain Time previous to the Commencement of the Augmentations established by the said Act. (Repealed by Statute Law Revision Act 1867 (30 & 31 Vict. c. 59))
Spitalfields Act 1765 or the Import of Silk Act 1765 or the Importation Act 1765 (repealed)	5 Geo. 3. c. 48	25 May 1765
An Act for prohibiting the Importation of Foreign-manufactured Silk Stockings, Silk Mitts, and Silk Gloves, into Great Britain and the British Dominions; and for rendering more effectual an Act passed in the Third Year of the Reign of His present Majesty, (Note: Silk Works Act 1763 (3 Geo. 3. c. 21)) for explaining, amending, and rendering more effectual, an Act made in the Nineteenth Year of the Reign of King Henry the Seventh, intituled, "Silk Works." (Note: Silk Works Act 1503 (19 Hen. 7. c. 21)) (Repealed by Customs Law Repeal Act 1825 (6 Geo. 4. c. 105))
Bank Notes (Scotland) Act 1765 (repealed)	5 Geo. 3. c. 49	25 May 1765
An Act to prevent the Inconveniencies arising from the present Method of issuing Notes and Bills, by the Banks, Banking Companies, and Bankers, in that Part of Great Britain called Scotland. (Repealed by Statute Law (Repeals) Act 1993 (c. 50))
Westminster Streets (No. 2) Act 1765 or the Westminster Paving Act 1765 (repealed)	5 Geo. 3. c. 50	25 May 1765
An Act to enlarge the Powers of, and to render more effectual, the several Acts passed in the Second, (Note: London Streets Act 1762 (2 Geo. 3. c. 21)) Third, (Note: London Streets Act 1763 (3 Geo. 3. c. 23)) and Fourth (Note: Westminster Streets Act 1763 (4 Geo. 3. c. 39)) Years of His present Majesty’s Reign, for paving, cleansing, lighting, and otherwise regulating the Squares, Streets, and other Places, within the City and Liberty of Westminster, and other Parts in the said Acts mentioned; and for extending the Provisions of the said Acts to the Surry Side of Westminster Bridge; and for enlarging the Powers of the said Acts with respect to Squares. (Repealed by Tothill Fields Improvement Act 1825 (6 Geo. 4. c. cxxxiv) and United Parishes of St. Andrew Holborn above the Bars and St. George the Martyr Improvement Act 1832 (2 & 3 Will. 4. c. lxvi))
Cloth Manufacture, Yorkshire Act 1765 (repealed)	5 Geo. 3. c. 51	25 May 1765
An Act for repealing several Laws relating to the Manufacture of Woollen Cloth in the County of York, and also so much of several other Laws as prescribes particular Standards of Width and Length of such Woollen Cloths; and for substituting other Regulations of the Cloth Trade within the West Riding of the said County; for preventing Frauds in certifying the Contents of the Cloth, and for preserving the Credit of the said Manufacture in the Foreign Market. (Repealed by Master and Servant Act 1889 (52 & 53 Vict. c. 24)))
Sussex and Kent Roads Act 1765 (repealed)	5 Geo. 3. c. 52	22 March 1765
An Act for repairing and widening the Road leading from the Town of Wadhurst in the County of Sussex, to the Turnpike Road at Lamberhurst Pound and Pullen's Hill in the County of Kent, and from the Top of Pullen's Hill, through the Parishes of Horsmonden, Marden, Yalden, and West Farley, to West Farley Street in the said County of Kent. (Repealed by Road from Wadhurst and from Pullen's Hill Act 1828 (9 Geo. 4. c. xvii))
Huntingdon Roads Act 1765 (repealed)	5 Geo. 3. c. 53	22 March 1765
An Act for continuing the Terms of several Acts, and for giving further Powers, for repairing the Road from Chatteris Ferry to Hammond's Eau and Somersham Bridge; and for amending and widening the Road from Somersham Bridge to the Sheep Market in Saint Ives, and also the Road branching out of the said Road near Stockbridge, through Needingworth, to Earith, in the County of Huntingdon. (Repealed by Somersham Road (Huntingdonshire) Act 1820 (1 Geo. 4. c. lxxix))
Dunham Ferry and Great Markham Common Road Act 1765 (repealed)	5 Geo. 3. c. 54	22 March 1765
An Act for repairing and widening the Road from Dunham Ferry to the South End of Great Markham Common, in the County of Nottingham. (Repealed by Dunham Ferry and Great Markham Common Road Act 1813 (53 Geo. 3. c. xii) and Annual Turnpike Acts Continuance Act 1869 (32 & 33 Vict. c. 90))
Berkshire and Oxford Roads Act 1765 (repealed)	5 Geo. 3. c. 55	22 March 1765
An Act to continue the Term, and to vary and enlarge the Powers, of an Act passed in the Twenty-fifth Year of His late Majesty, (Note: Berkshire Roads Act 1751 (25 Geo. 2. c. 21)) for repairing the Road from Wallingford in the County of Berks to Wantage, and from thence to Faringdon, and also from Wantage to Idson in the said County, so far as the same relate to the Road leading from Wallingford to Wantage, and from thence to Faringdon; and for discontinuing the said Term and Powers, so far as the same relate to the Road leading from Wantage to Idson; and for repairing the Road leading from the North East Corner of Nuffield Common, by the Parish Church of Nuffield otherwise Tuffield, in the County of Oxford, to the Commencement of the said Turnpike Road leading from Wallingford to Wantage. (Repealed by Nuffield and Faringdon Road Act 1841 (4 & 5 Vict. c. cvii))
Anglesey Roads Act 1765 (repealed)	5 Geo. 3. c. 56	22 March 1765
An Act for repairing and widening the Road leading from Porthaethwy Ferry (Note: The Porthaethwy Ferry crossed the Menai Straights, and landed at the Porth y Wrach slipway in what is now known as Menai Bridge. 53°13′26″N 4°09′41″W) to Holyhead, in the County of Anglesey. (Repealed by Roads Between London and Holyhead Act 1819 (59 Geo. 3. c. 48))
Sussex Roads Act 1765 (repealed)	5 Geo. 3. c. 57	22 March 1765
An Act for continuing the Term, and altering and enlarging the Powers, of an Act passed in the Thirtieth Year of the Reign of His late Majesty, (Note: Surrey and Sussex Roads Act 1757 (30 Geo. 2. c. 50)) for amending, widening, and keeping in Repair, the Roads leading from the Village of Milford in the County of Surry, through Petworth, to the Top of Duncton Hill, and from Petworth to Stopham Bridge, in the County of Sussex. (Repealed by Petworth Turnpike Roads Act 1854 (17 & 18 Vict. c. lxxi))
Great Torrington Roads Act 1765 (repealed)	5 Geo. 3. c. 58	22 March 1765
An Act for repairing, widening, and keeping in Repair, several Roads in and near Great Torrington, in the County of Devon. (Repealed by Great Torrington Roads Act 1824 (5 Geo. 4. c. lxxxi))
Lymington Roads Act 1765 (repealed)	5 Geo. 3. c. 59	22 March 1765
An Act for repairing and widening several Roads leading from the Quay at Lymington, in the County of Southampton. (Repealed by Lymington Roads Act 1828 (9 Geo. 4. c. cvii))
Essex, Suffolk and Hertford Roads Act 1765 (repealed)	5 Geo. 3. c. 60	22 March 1765
An Act for continuing and rendering more effectual Two Acts, passed in the Twelfth Year of King George the First, (Note: Essex Roads Act 1725 (12 Geo. 1. c. 23)) and the Twentieth of His late Majesty, (Note: Essex Roads Act 1746 (20 Geo. 2. c. 7)) for repairing the several Roads therein mentioned, in the Counties of Essex and Suffolk; and for repairing and widening several other Roads, in the Counties of Essex and Hertford. (Repealed by Statute Law (Repeals) Act 2008 (c. 12))
Crewkerne Roads Act 1765 (repealed)	5 Geo. 3. c. 61	22 March 1765
An Act for repairing, widening, and keeping in Repair, several Roads leading to and from Crewkerne, in the County of Somerset. (Repealed by Roads to and from Crewkerne Act 1805 (45 Geo. 3. c. iii))
Warminster Roads Act 1765 (repealed)	5 Geo. 3. c. 62	19 April 1765
An Act for enlarging the Terms and Powers of Two Acts, of the Thirteenth of George the First, (Note: Warminster Roads Act 1726 (13 Geo. 1. c. 16)) and of the Sixteenth of His late Majesty, (Note: Warminster Roads Act 1742 (16 Geo. 2. c. 5)) for repairing several Roads leading from the Town of Warminster, in the County of Wilts; and for amending several other Roads near the said Town; and for repealing so much of an Act made in the First Year of the Reign of His present Majesty, (Note: Wilts Roads Act 1760 (1 Geo. 3. c. 37)) for repairing several Roads therein mentioned, in the said County, as relates to the Road within the Town of Heytesbury; and for other Purposes therein mentioned. (Repealed by Warminster Roads Act 1815 (55 Geo. 3. c. lxxxvii))
Kent Roads Act 1765 (repealed)	5 Geo. 3. c. 63	19 April 1765
An Act for repairing and widening the Roads leading from the Turnpike Road at Kipping's Cross in the Parish of Brenchley in the County of Kent, through the Parishes of Brenchley, Horsmonsden, and Goudhurst, by the Left Hand Side of Iden Green, to the Turnpike Road on Wilsley Green in the Parish of Cranbrooke; and from a Place near Goudhurst Gore, through the Parish of Marden, to Stile Bridge in the said Parish; and from Underden Green in Marden aforesaid to Wanshutts Green in the County of Kent. (Repealed by Roads from Kipping's Cross, Goudhurst Gore and Underden Green Act 1828 (9 Geo. 4. c. xvi))
Hurst Green Road Act 1765 (repealed)	5 Geo. 3. c. 64	19 April 1765
An Act for repairing, widening, and keeping in Repair, the Road leading from the Turnpike Road on Hurst Green (Note: Hurst Green, East Sussex.) in the County of Sussex, through Etchingham (Note: Etchingham, East Sussex.) and Burwash, (Note: Burwash, East Sussex.) to the Extent of the said Parish of Burwash in the said County. (Repealed by Milford, Petworth and Stopham Bridge Roads Act 1820 (1 Geo. 4. c. xliv) and Roads from Lewes Act 1830 (11 Geo. 4 & 1 Will. 4. c. lxxxii))
Church of All Hallows, City Act 1765	5 Geo. 3. c. 65	19 April 1765
An Act for re-building the Parish Church of Allhallows on the Wall, in the City of London; and for re-building the House belonging to the Rector of the said Parish; and for purchasing several Pieces of Ground and Tenements thereon, to render the Passages to and from the said Church and House more commodious.
Southampton Roads Act 1765 (repealed)	5 Geo. 3. c. 66	19 April 1765
An Act to continue the Term, and enlarge the Powers, of an Act passed in the Second Year of the Reign of His present Majesty, (Note: Southampton and Wilts Road Act 1762 (2 Geo. 3. c. 39)) for repairing and widening the Road from Mullen's Pond in the County of Southampton, to the Eighteen Mile Stone from the City of Salisbury, and several other Roads in the said Act mentioned; and also for repairing and widening several other Roads leading out of the said Roads; and for other Purposes therein mentioned. (Repealed by Southampton and Salisbury Roads Act 1804 (44 Geo. 3. c. v) and Mullen's Pond (Southampton) and Salisbury Road and Branches Act 1825 (6 Geo. 4. c. xcv))
Balby to Worksop Road Act 1765 (repealed)	5 Geo. 3. c. 67	19 April 1765
An Act for amending the Road from The Pinfold in Balby in the County of York, to Worksop in the County of Nottingham. (Repealed by Balby and Worksop Turnpike Road Act 1828 (9 Geo. 4. c. xlvi))
Kent and Surrey Roads Act 1765 (repealed)	5 Geo. 3. c. 68	19 April 1765
An Act for repairing, widening, and keeping in Repair, the Road leading from the Turnpike Road at Wrotham Heath in the County of Kent, to the Turnpike Road leading from Croydon to Godstone in the County of Surrey. (Repealed by Wrotham Heath and Croydon and Godstone Road Act 1829 (10 Geo. 4. c. xx))
Devon Roads Act 1765 (repealed)	5 Geo. 3. c. 69	19 April 1765
An Act for repairing and widening the Roads from the South End of Newton Abbott to the Passage Way in Kinswear opposite Clifton Dartmouth Hardness, and from the End of a Lane leading out of the Turnpike Road between Newton Abbott and Totness towards Abbotts Kenswell to Five Lanes, and from Langvers Barn to the said Turnpike Road between Newton Abbott and Totnes, and from Galmpton Warborough to Monk's Bridge and Brixham Quay, and from Langvers Barn to the North End of Paington Town, all in the County of Devon. (Repealed by Newton Abbott and Torquay Roads Act 1823 (4 Geo. 4. c. xvii))
Devon Roads (No. 2) Act 1765 (repealed)	5 Geo. 3. c. 70	19 April 1765
An Act for repairing and widening the Roads from Keyberry Bridge to the Passage at Shalldon, and from the said Bridge to the Pier or Harbour of Torkey, in the County of Devon. (Repealed by Newton Abbott and Torquay Roads Act 1823 (4 Geo. 4. c. xvii))
Kent Roads (No. 2) Act 1765 (repealed)	5 Geo. 3. c. 71	19 April 1765
An Act for repairing and widening the Road from Tonbridge to Maidstone, and from Watt's Cross to Cowden, in the County of Kent. (Repealed by Tonbridge and Maidstone Road Act 1829 (10 Geo. 4. c. lxii))
Yorks Roads Act 1765 (repealed)	5 Geo. 3. c. 72	19 April 1765
An Act for amending and widening the Road from the Sign of The Coach and Horses in Birstall (Note: Birstall, West Yorkshire.) to the Turnpike Road at Nunbrook, (Note: The meeting point of the A62 and the A644 roads (the Dewsbury to Elland Turnpike), where the roads cross the Nun Brook. 53°41′10″N 1°43′35″W) and from Bradley Lane (Note: Bradley, Huddersfield.) to the Town of Huddersfield, (Note: Huddersfield, West Yorkshire.) in the West Riding of the County of York. (Repealed by Birstal and Huddersfield Roads Act 1828 (9 Geo. 4. c. lxxxiii))
Lincoln Roads Act 1765 (repealed)	5 Geo. 3. c. 73	19 April 1765
An Act for repairing and widening the Road from Great Grimsby Haven, at or near a Place called The Upper Sand End, to Wold Newton Church, and from Nun's Farm to the Mill Field in the Parish of Irby, in the County of Lincoln. (Repealed by Road from Great Grimsby Haven to Irby Act 1828 (9 Geo. 4. c. lxviii))
Cambridge Roads Act 1765 (repealed)	5 Geo. 3. c. 74	19 April 1765
An Act for enlarging the Powers of several Acts, for repairing the Road from Stump Cross to Newmarket Heath, and from the Town of Cambridge, and from Foulmire to Cambridge, and other Roads adjoining thereto, so far as the same relate to the Road from Foulmire to Cambridge, and the said other Roads adjoining thereto. (Repealed by Cambridge Roads Act 1790 (30 Geo. 3. c. 94))
Dorset and Devon Roads Act 1765 (repealed)	5 Geo. 3. c. 75	19 April 1765
An Act for enlarging the Term and Powers of so much of an Act made in the Twenty-seventh Year of the Reign of His late Majesty, (Note: Axminster Roads Act 1754 (27 Geo. 2. c. 32)) for repairing several Roads in the Counties of Dorset and Devon, as relates to the Road from Penn Inn in the County of Dorset, to the Workhouse at the East End of the Town of Honiton in the County of Devon, and to the Road from the Intrenchment on Askerwell Hill to Penn Inn, and from Bridport to Beamister; and for repairing and amending several other Roads, therein mentioned, in the Counties of Dorset and Devon. (Repealed by Roads to and from Bridport Act 1819 (59 Geo. 3. c. lxxxviii) and Axminster Roads Act 1822 (3 Geo. 4. c. cv))
Carmarthen Roads Act 1765 (repealed)	5 Geo. 3. c. 76	10 May 1765
An Act for repairing, widening, and keeping in Repair, several Roads leading from Kidwelly, in the County of Carmarthen; and also several Roads leading from Llandilo, in the said County. (Repealed by Kidwelly District of Roads Act 1824 (5 Geo. 4. c. ii), Roads in Carmarthen Act 1828 (9 Geo. 4. c. lxxxi) and South Wales Turnpike Trusts Act 1844 (7 & 8 Vict. c. 91) (Note: Cited as "7-8 V c 9" in the Chronological Table of the Statutes.))
Herts and Hunts Roads Act 1765 (repealed)	5 Geo. 3. c. 77	19 April 1765
An Act for enlarging the Terms and Powers of several Acts, of the Ninth (Note: Royston and Wandesford Bridge Road Act 1710 (9 Ann. c. 14)) and Twelfth (Note: Royston and Wandesford Bridge Road Act 1713 (13 Ann. c. 33)) Years of Queen Anne, and of the Thirteenth of King George the First, (Note: Hertfordshire Roads Act 1726 (13 Geo. 1. c. 32)) and of the Fourteenth of His late Majesty, (Note: Royston and Wandesford Bridge Road Act 1740 (14 Geo. 2. c. 13)) for repairing the Highways leading from Royston in the County of Hertford, to Wansford Bridge in the County of Huntingdon, so far as relates to the Middle and South Divisions of Roads comprised in the said Acts; and for amending the Road from the Town of Huntingdon to the Causeway at or near the West End of the Town of Somerham in the said County of Huntingdon. (Repealed by Road from Royston to Wandesford Bridge Act 1815 (55 Geo. 3. c. xxxv) and Royston and Wandesford Bridge Road Act 1822 (3 Geo. 4. c. lxviii))
Welford and Leicester Road Act 1765 (repealed)	5 Geo. 3. c. 78	19 April 1765
An Act for repairing, widening, and keeping in Repair, the Road from Welford Bridge in the County of Northampton, through Husband's Bosworth and Great Wigston, to Milston Lane in the Town of Leicester. (Repealed by Road from Welford Bridge Act 1805 (45 Geo. 3. c. lxxviii))
Cambridge Roads (No. 2) Act 1765 (repealed)	5 Geo. 3. c. 79	19 April 1765
An Act to continue the Term, and alter and enlarge the Powers, of an Act passed in the Third Year of His present Majesty, (Note: Cambridge and Ely Roads Act 1763 (3 Geo. 3. c. 36)) for repairing, widening, turning, and keeping in Repair, the Road from the Town of Cambridge to Ely, and from thence to Soham; and for building a Bridge cross the River Ouze, at or near a Place called Stretham Ferry, in the County of Cambridge; and for repairing and widening and making several other Roads, adjoining to the Roads directed to be repaired and widened by the said Act. (Repealed by Cambridge to Downham Road Act 1804 (44 Geo. 3. c. lxx) and Cambridge and Ely Roads Act 1824 (5 Geo. 4. c. lx))
Chapel on the Heath and Bourton on the Hill Road Act 1765 (repealed)	5 Geo. 3. c. 80	19 April 1765
An Act for continuing the Terms of several Acts, and for giving further Powers, for repairing the Road leading from Chapel on the Heath in the County of Oxford, to Bourton on the Hill in the County of Gloucester. (Repealed by Statute Law (Repeals) Act 2013 (c. 2))
Manchester Improvement Act 1765 (repealed)	5 Geo. 3. c. 81	19 April 1765
An Act for cleansing and lighting the Streets, Lanes, and Passages, within the Towns of Manchester and Salford in the County Palatine of Lancaster; and for providing Fire Engines and Firemen, and for preventing Annoyances, within the said Towns. (Repealed by Manchester and Salford Improvement Act 1792 (32 Geo. 3. c. 69))
Ramsgate and Sandwich Harbours Act 1765 (repealed)	5 Geo. 3. c. 82	19 April 1765
An Act to enlarge certain Powers granted by an Act passed in the Twenty-second Year of the Reign of King George the Second, intituled, "An Act for enlarging and maintaining the Harbour of Ramsgate; and for cleansing, amending, and preserving, the Haven of Sandwich." (Note: Ramsgate and Sandwich Harbours Act 1748 (22 Geo. 2. c. 40)) (Repealed by Ramsgate Harbour and Sandwich Act 1792 (32 Geo. 3. c. 74))
Norfolk Roads Act 1765 (repealed)	5 Geo. 3. c. 83	10 May 1765
An Act for amending the Road from Chatteris Ferry, (Note: Chatteris Ferry, on the Chatteris Road. 52°25′47″N 0°01′59″E) through Chatteris and March, to Wisbech Saint Peters, (Note: Wisbech, Cambridgeshire.) and from thence to Tid Gole in the Isle of Ely, and from Wisbech aforesaid, through Outwell, to Downham Bridge, in the County of Norfolk; and for repealing the several Acts for repairing the said Road between Wisbech and March. (Repealed by Chatteris Ferry and Downham Bridge Road Act 1828 (9 Geo. 4. c. lxxiii))
Stafford Roads Act 1765 (repealed)	5 Geo. 3. c. 84	10 May 1765
An Act for repairing and widening the Road from Newcastle under Lyne to Hassop, and from Middle Hills to the Macclesfield Turnpike Road near Buxton; and also the Road branching out of the said first-mentioned Road at Cobridge to Burslem, and to the Uttoxeter Turnpike at Shelton, in the County of Stafford. (Repealed by Newcastle-under-Lyme and Leek Roads Act 1828 (9 Geo. 4. c. iv) and Leek, Buxton and Monyash Turnpike Road Act 1852 (15 & 16 Vict. c. cxv))
Notts and Lincoln Roads Act 1765 (repealed)	5 Geo. 3. c. 85	10 May 1765
An Act for repairing and widening the Roads from Bawtry Bridge in the County of Nottingham, to Hainton in the County of Lincoln; and from North Willingham to the North End of the Lane between Dexthorpe and Langton; and from West Rassin to Pilford Bridge; and from the Great Road near Bishop Bridge to Bishop Norton Common; and from the Hamlet of Morton to Epworth; and from Haxey Field to The Trent, at Kinnald Ferry in the said County of Lincoln. (Repealed by Road from Bawtry Bridge to Hainton (Lincolnshire) Act 1827 (7 & 8 Geo. 4. c. lvii))
Salop Roads Act 1765 (repealed)	5 Geo. 3. c. 86	10 May 1765
An Act for enlarging the Term and Powers of an Act, made in the Twenty-fifth Year of the Reign of His late Majesty, (Note: Shropshire Roads Act 1751 (25 Geo. 2. c. 49)) for repairing the High Road from the Town of Shrewsbury, through Cressage, Harley, Much Wenlock, by Muckley Cross, and through Morville, to Bridgnorth, in the County of Salop; and for amending several other Roads near or adjoining thereto. (Repealed by Shrewsbury, Wenlock and Bridgnorth Turnpike Roads Act 1851 (14 & 15 Vict. c. xxiv))
South London Roads Act 1765 (repealed)	5 Geo. 3. c. 87	10 May 1765
An Act to amend several Acts, passed in the Fourth (Note: Southwark, Greenwich and Lewisham Roads Act 1717 (4 Geo. 1. c. 5 Pr.)) and Sixth (Note: Surrey and Kent Roads Act 1719 (6 Geo. 1. c. 26)) Years of King George the First, for repairing several Roads from The Stones End in Kent Street and Bermondsey Street, Southwark, to Dartford, and to the Extent of the Parish of Lewisham next Bromley and Beckenham, in the County of Kent; and for extending the said Acts to the Repair of the Roads leading from the End of the present Turnpike to the West End of Stroud Green, and to Farnborough Well, and to The Stones End in London Street, Greenwich, and to the North End of Burnt Ash Lane in the Parish of Lee; and from the West End of Greenwich Park Wall to Woolwich Warren; and for making an Allowance, out of the Tolls arising by the said Acts, to the Trustees for putting in Execution an Act of the Twenty-second Year of King George the Second, (Note: Southwark Roads Act 1748 (22 Geo. 2. c. 31)) for opening and making a new Road from the East End of New Street, in the Parish of Saint John, Southwark, to and through the several Places therein mentioned; and for keeping the said Road in Repair for the future. (Repealed by Kent and Surrey Roads Act 1781 (21 Geo. 3. c. 100))
Lincoln Roads (No. 2) Act 1765 (repealed)	5 Geo. 3. c. 88	10 May 1765
An Act for repairing and widening the Road from Barton Watersidehouse (Note: Waterside House, Barton Waterside, Lincolnshire. 53°41′47″N 0°26′38″W) to Riseham Hedge Corner, and several other Roads, in the County of Lincoln, therein mentioned. (Repealed by Road from Barton Waterside House (Lincolnshire) Act 1827 (7 & 8 Geo. 4. c. lxvii))
Perth Bridge Act 1765	5 Geo. 3. c. 89	15 May 1765
An Act for the building a Bridge over the River Tay, at or near the Town of Perth, in the County of Perth.
Notts and Derby Roads Act 1765 (repealed)	5 Geo. 3. c. 90	10 May 1765
An Act for repairing and widening the Road from the Alfreton Turnpike Road, near a Place called Little Robins, in the Parish of Mansfield, in the County of Nottingham, through Woolley Moor, to the Nottingham Turnpike Road near Tansley in the County of Derby, and from Woolley Moor to the Chesterfield Turnpike Road at Kelstidge in the County of Derby. (Repealed by Road from Mansfield to the Nottingham Turnpike Road Act 1832 (2 & 3 Will. 4. c. xxxii))
City of London (Improvement) Act 1765 (repealed)	5 Geo. 3. c. 91	10 May 1765
An Act for vesting certain Glebe Lands belonging to the Rectory of the Parish Church of Saint Christopher, in the City of London, in the Governor and Company of the Bank of England; and for making a Recompense to the Rector of the said Parish and his Successors, in Lieu thereof; and for obviating certain Doubts in an Act passed in the Thirty-third Year of the Reign of His late Majesty, (Note: London Streets, City Act 1759 (33 Geo. 2. c. 30)) for widening certain Streets, Lanes, and Passages, within the City of London. (Repealed by Statute Law (Repeals) Act 1995 (c. 44))
Taunton Roads Act 1765 (repealed)	5 Geo. 3. c. 92	10 May 1765
An Act for explaining and amending, and likewise for enlarging, the Term and Powers granted by a certain Act of Parliament, passed in the Twenty-fifth Year of the Reign of His late Majesty King George the Second, intituled, "An Act for amending several Roads leading from the Town of Taunton, in the County of Somerset." (Note: Taunton Roads Act 1751 (25 Geo. 2. c. 54)) (Repealed by Taunton Roads Act 1778 (18 Geo. 3. c. 97))
Somerset and Devon Roads Act 1765 (repealed)	5 Geo. 3. c. 93	10 May 1765
An Act for repairing, widening, turning, altering, and keeping in Repair, the Roads leading from the Port Town and Borough of Minehead, through Dunster and Timberscombe, to Hele Bridge, and through the Town of Dulverton, and by the River and Brushford Green, to Exbridge in the County of Somerset, and from thence to Baltham Bridge in the Town of Bampton in the County of Devon; and also the Road leading from the said Port Town and Borough of Minehead, through Carhampton and Bilbrooke, to Harrow Gate in the Parish of Stogumber in the County of Somerset; and also the Road leading from Carhampton aforesaid, through the Town of Watchet in the Parish of Saint Decumans in the County of Somerset, to or near the Village of Rydon, and by Long Cross Barn to the End of the Bridgewater Turnpike Road in the Town of Nether Stowey in the County of Somerset; and also from the said Town of Watchet to Tower Hill in the Village of Wiliton in the said Parish of Saint Decumans; and from the said Town of Watchet, by Way of Five Bells, to Fair Cross, and from thence to Stickle Path, over Brendon Hill, to Robery Lane, and to Bampton, in the said County of Devon. (Repealed by Minehead and Bampton Road and Branch Act 1822 (3 Geo. 4. c. xcix) and Minehead District of Roads Act 1828 (9 Geo. 4. c. lxxxiv))
Hertford Church Act 1765	5 Geo. 3. c. 94	10 May 1765
An Act for repairing the Church of the United Parishes of All Saints and Saint John, in the Town of Hertford.
Hants Roads Act 1765 (repealed)	5 Geo. 3. c. 95	10 May 1765
An Act for repairing and widening the Road leading from a Street called The Hundred at Romsey, through Chilworth, to the River at Swathling in the County of Southampton; and for connecting the same with the Road leading from the City of Winchester, through Hursley, to Chandler's Ford; and from Hursley aforesaid to the Turnpike Road at Romsey aforesaid; and also for repairing and widening the Road leading from the River at Swathling aforesaid, through Botley, to the Turnpike Road at Sherril Heath in the said County of Southampton. (Repealed by Winchester Roads Act 1823 (4 Geo. 4. c. cxx) and Swathling, Botley and Sherril Heath Road (Hampshire) Act 1829 (10 Geo. 4. c. lxxxi))
Alford to Cowbridge Road Act 1765 (repealed)	5 Geo. 3. c. 96	10 May 1765
An Act for repairing and widening the Road from Alford to Boston, and from thence to Cowbridge, in the County of Lincoln. (Repealed by Alford and Boston Road Act 1827 (7 & 8 Geo. 4. c. xvii))
Witford, etc., Suffolk (Poor Relief) Act 1765 (repealed)	5 Geo. 3. c. 97	10 May 1765
An Act for the better Relief and Employment of the Poor in the Hundreds of Loes and Wilford, in the County of Suffolk. (Repealed by Loes and Wilford, Suffolk Poor Relief Act 1791 (31 Geo. 3. c. 72))
Crossford Bridge and Manchester Road Act 1765 (repealed)	5 Geo. 3. c. 98	10 May 1765
An Act to enlarge the Term and Powers of an Act, made in the Twenty-fourth Year of His late Majesty, (Note: Crossford Bridge and Manchester Road Act 1750 (24 Geo. 2. c. 13)) for repairing the Road from Crossford Bridge (Note: Crossford Bridge is located where the Watling Street Roman road (now the A56 road) crosses the River Mersey between Sale and Stretford. 53°26′05″N 2°18′59″W) to Manchester; and for amending the Road from Crossford Bridge aforesaid to a certain Place in Altrincham, in the County Palatine of Chester. (Repealed by Crossford Bridge and Manchester Road Act 1798 (38 Geo. 3. c. lxxi) and Road from Crossford Bridge to Altrincham (Cheshire) Act 1827 (7 & 8 Geo. 4. c. xcv))
Roads from York and from Grimston Act 1765 (repealed)	5 Geo. 3. c. 99	10 May 1765
An Act for amending and widening the Road from the City of York, by Grimston Smithy, to Kexby Bridge, and from Grimston Smithy aforesaid to a certain Gate at the Upper End of Garraby Hill, in the County of York. (Repealed by Roads from York and from Grimston Act 1807 (47 Geo. 3 Sess. 2. c. cxxxiii))
Chester, Lancaster and Yorks Roads Act 1765 (repealed)	5 Geo. 3. c. 100	10 May 1765
An Act for repairing and widening the Road from Stockport in the County of Chester, to Saxon's Lane End in the County of Lancaster; and from the Cross in Ashton under Line in the said County of Lancaster to Doctor's Lane Head, in the County of York; and also the Road branching out of the said first mentioned Road in the Township of Bredbury to Mottram, in the said County of Chester. (Repealed by Stockport and Saxon's Lane End Road Act 1804 (44 Geo. 3. c. xxiv))
Norfolk Roads (No. 2) Act 1765 (repealed)	5 Geo. 3. c. 101	10 May 1765
An Act for repairing and widening the Roads from the Little Bridge, over the End of the Drain next Wisbech River, lying between Roper's Fields and The Bell Inn in Wisbech, in the Isle of Ely, to the Sign of The Bear in Walsoken, in the County of Norfolk; and from Walsoken Bridge (lying over the same Drain) to the said Sign of The Bear, and to Lord's Bridge in Islington, and from thence to the West Ends of Maudlin Bridge and German's Bridge, in the County of Norfolk; and from the East End of German's Bridge aforesaid to the West End of Long Budge in South Lynn, in the Borough of King’s Lynn, in the said County of Norfolk; and from Islington aforesaid to Cross Keys Wash in the said County. (Repealed by Wisbech and King's Lynn Roads Act 1823 (4 Geo. 4. c. lv))
Dorset and Somerset Roads Act 1765	5 Geo. 3. c. 102	10 May 1765
An Act for repairing and widening several Roads leading from between the Second and Third Mile Stones on the Turnpike Road between the Town and County of Poole and Winborne Minister in the County of Dorset, to Bratton Corner in the County of Somerset.
Ratcliffe Highway Act 1765 (repealed)	5 Geo. 3. c. 103	10 May 1765
An Act to enlarge the Term and Powers of an Act made in the Twenty-seventh Year of His late Majesty, (Note: Ratcliff Highway Act 1754 (27 Geo. 2. c. 40)) for opening, making, widening, and keeping in Repair, a Road from Ratcliffe Highway, through Cannon Street, in the County of Middlesex, and other Roads in the said Act mentioned; and for lighting, watching, and watering, the said Roads. (Repealed by Commercial and East India and Barking Roads Act 1828 (9 Geo. 4. c. cxii))
Somerset Roads Act 1765	5 Geo. 3. c. 104	10 May 1765
An Act for enlarging the Term and Powers granted by an Act passed in the Twenty-sixth Year of His late Majesty's Reign, intituled, "An Act for repairing and widening the Roads therein mentioned, leading to and from the Towns of Shepton Mallet and Ivelchester, in the County of Somerset;" (Note: Somerset Roads (No. 2) Act 1753 (26 Geo. 2. c. 71)) and for repairing the Roads from Shepton Mallet to Leighton, and from Shepton Mallet to Long Cross Bottom.
Banbury to Lutterworth Road Act 1765 (repealed)	5 Geo. 3. c. 105	15 May 1765
An Act for repairing and widening the Road from the Turnpike Road in Banbury, in the County of Oxford, through Daventry and Cottesbach, to the South End of Mill Field, in the Parish of Lutterworth, in the County of Leicester. (Repealed by Banbury and Lutterworth Road Act 1828 (9 Geo. 4. c. lxxxvi))
Lincoln and Northants Roads Act 1765 (repealed)	5 Geo. 3. c. 106	15 May 1765
An Act to continue the Term, and render more effectual, an Act passed in the Thirtieth Year of the Reign of His late Majesty, (Note: Lincoln and Northampton Roads Act 1757 (30 Geo. 2. c. 68)) for repairing and widening the Roads leading from Spalding High Bridge, (Note: High Bridge in Spalding, Lincolnshire carries a road across the River Welland between the B1172 Bridge Street and the B1173 High Street/Church Gate. 52°47′10″N 0°09′00″W) through Littleworth, (Note: Littleworth is just to the south of Deeping St Nicholas. 52°43′19″N 0°12′39″W) and by Frognall, (Note: Frognall 52°40′44″N 0°17′02″W) and over James Deeping Stone Bridge (Note: The stone bridge in Deeping St James carries the B1162 over the River Welland to join the B1166 Bridge Street. 52°40′16″N 0°17′59″W) in the County of Lincoln, to Maxey Outgang (Note: The village of Maxey, Cambridgeshire. 52°39′35″N 0°19′44″W) in the County of Northampton, adjoining to the High Road (Note: High Street, Maxey, Cambridgeshire.) there. (Repealed by Spalding, James Deeping Stone Bridge and Maxey Outgang Road Act 1821 (1 & 2 Geo. 4. c. xxxiv))
Warwick and Northampton Road Act 1765 (repealed)	5 Geo. 3. c. 107	15 May 1765
An Act for repairing and widening the Road from the Great Bridge (Note: Old Castle Bridge, Warwick; it was destroyed by floods in 1795. 52°16′45″N 1°35′00″W) in the Borough of Warwick, through Southam and Daventry, to the Town of Northampton. (Repealed by Warwick and Northampton Road Act 1832 (2 & 3 Will. 4. c. xcviii))
Malton and Pickering Road Act 1765 (repealed)	5 Geo. 3. c. 108	15 May 1765
An Act for amending and widening the Road from the North End of Old Malton Gate, in the Town and Borough of New Malton, to the Town of Pickering, in the County of York. (Repealed by Road from North Malton Gate to Pickering Act 1825 (6 Geo. 4. c. clviii))

=== Private acts ===
Short title	Citation	Royal assent
Long title
Podington Inclosure Act 1765	5 Geo. 3. c. 1 Pr.	11 February 1765
An Act for dividing and enclosing the Open and Common Fields, Common Meadows, Common Pastures, and Commonable Waste Grounds, in the Manor and Parish of Podington, in the County of Bedford.
Hardingstone and Cotton Inclosure Act 1765 (repealed)	5 Geo. 3. c. 2 Pr.	11 February 1765
An Act for dividing and enclosing the Open Common Fields, Common Pastures, Common Meadows, Common Grounds, Lanes, and Waste Ground, within the Manors and Parish of Hardingstone and Cotton, in the County of Northampton. (Repealed by Northampton Act 1988 (c. xxix))
Naturalization of John Plauel, John Long, Jacob Nadal, and Christopher Baumer.	5 Geo. 3. c. 3 Pr.	11 February 1765
An Act for naturalizing John William Plauel, John James Long, Jacob Nadal, and Christopher Henry Baumer.
Lang's Naturalization Act 1765	5 Geo. 3. c. 4 Pr.	11 February 1765
An Act for naturalizing Luder Lang.
Strackhoven's Naturalization Act 1765	5 Geo. 3. c. 5 Pr.	11 February 1765
An Act for naturalizing Christian James Strackhoven.
Donnington Inclosure Act 1765	5 Geo. 3. c. 6 Pr.	22 March 1765
An Act for dividing and enclosing the Open Commons, Common Fields, Meadows, and Grounds, lying in the Hamlet of Donington, in the Parish or Stow on the Wold, in the County of Gloucester.
Westcot Inclosure Act 1765	5 Geo. 3. c. 7 Pr.	22 March 1765
An Act for dividing and enclosing certain Open and Common Fields, Common Pastures, Common Meadows, and Commonable Waste Grounds, in the Manor, Hamlet, and Tything of Westcote, the Parish of Waddesdon, in the County of Bucks.
Long Eaton Inclosure Act 1765	5 Geo. 3. c. 8 Pr.	22 March 1765
An Act for dividing and enclosing the Common Fields, Meadows, Pastures, and Waste Grounds, in the Manor of Long Eaton, in the Parish of Sawley, in the County of Derby.
Ulrome Inclosure Act 1765	5 Geo. 3. c. 9 Pr.	22 March 1765
An Act for dividing and enclosing the Open and Common Fields and Grounds within the Township of Ulrome otherwise Owram, in Holderness, in the County of York.
North Kilworth Inclosure Act 1765	5 Geo. 3. c. 10 Pr.	22 March 1765
An Act for dividing and enclosing the Open and Common Fields, Common Meadows, Common Pastures, Common Grounds, and Waste Grounds, in the Parish of North Kilworth, in the County of Leicester.
Annexing Colerne rectory (Wiltshire) to the office of Warden of New College, Oxford.	5 Geo. 3. c. 11 Pr.	22 March 1765
An Act for annexing the Rectory of Colerne, in the County of Wilts, to the Office of Warden of the College of Saint Mary of Winchester in Oxford.
Wilson's Estate Act 1765	5 Geo. 3. c. 12 Pr.	22 March 1765
An Act for vesting the settled Estates of Ann Wilson Widow and Ann Wilson her Daughter, an Infant, in Trustees, to be sold, for discharging the Debts and Encumbrances affecting the same.
Hancorn's Name Act 1765	5 Geo. 3. c. 13 Pr.	22 March 1765
An Act to enable Richard Duppa Clerk (heretofore called Richard Hancorn) and his Heirs Male to take and use the Surname and Arms of Duppa, pursuant to the Will of Baldwin Duppa Esquire, deceased.
Ager's Name Act 1765	5 Geo. 3. c. 14 Pr.	22 March 1765
An Act to enable William Ager and his Issue to take and use the Surname of Turnor.
Jennings' Name Act 1765	5 Geo. 3. c. 15 Pr.	22 March 1765
An Act to enable John Jennings Esquire (now called John Smith) and his Heirs to take and use the Surname of Smith, pursuant to the Will of Thomas Smith, deceased.
Metcalfe's Name Act 1765	5 Geo. 3. c. 16 Pr.	22 March 1765
An Act to enable William Marwood Esquire, lately called William Metcalfe and his Issue, to take, use, and bear, the Surname and Arms of Marwood, pursuant to the Will of Janc Turner Widow, deceased.
Blondeau's Name Act 1765	5 Geo. 3. c. 17 Pr.	22 March 1765
An Act to enable William Nevil Blondeau Esquire and his. Issue to take and use the Surname of Hart.
Tribe's Name Act 1765	5 Geo. 3. c. 18 Pr.	22 March 1765
An Act to enable Benjamin Francis Tribe Esquire, and his Heirs, to take and use the Surname of Poole, pursuant to the Will of Elizabeth Ludwell, deceased.
Jager's Naturalization Act 1765	5 Geo. 3. c. 19 Pr.	22 March 1765
An Act for naturalizing Dirk Jager of the City of London Merchant.
Naturalization of Andrew Fuhrer and Rene Labutte.	5 Geo. 3. c. 20 Pr.	22 March 1765
An Act for naturalizing Andrew Fuhrer and René Labutté.
Naturalization of John Jaquery, Peter Darbonnier, Daniel Henriod, John Osvald, and John Rivaz.	5 Geo. 3. c. 21 Pr.	22 March 1765
An Act for naturalizing John Elias Jacquery, Peter Samuel Darbonnier, Daniel Henriod, John James Osvald, and John Francis Anthony Riuaz.
Naturalization of Peter Anthony and David Francis Sapte.	5 Geo. 3. c. 22 Pr.	22 March 1765
An Act for naturalizing Peter Anthony Sapte and David Francis Sapte.
Flamborough Inclosure Act 1765	5 Geo. 3. c. 23 Pr.	19 April 1765
An Act for dividing and enclosing the Open and Common Arable Fields, Meadows, Pastures, Commons, and Waste Grounds, in the Lordship and Parish of Flamborough, in the County of York.
Everingham Inclosure Act 1765	5 Geo. 3. c. 24 Pr.	19 April 1765
An Act for dividing and allotting the Commons or Wastes, and the Common Fields, and Ings, in the Manor and Township of Evenngham, in the County of York; and for other Purposes therein mentioned.
Horley and Hornton Inclosure Act 1765	5 Geo. 3. c. 25 Pr.	19 April 1765
An Act for dividing and enclosing the Open and Common Fields, Common Meadows, Common Pastures, Common Grounds, and Commonable Lands, lying within the Townships and Hamlets Horley and Hornton, in the Parish of Horley aforesaid, in the County of Oxford.
Fenton and East Moor in Kettlethorpe (Lincolnshire) Inclosure Act 1765	5 Geo. 3. c. 26 Pr.	19 April 1765
An Act for dividing and alloting certain Open Fields, Meadows, and Stinted Pastures, in the Township of Fenton in the Parish of Kettlethorpe in the County of Lincoln, and a certain Free Common called The East Moor in the same Parish.
Newton and Kettlethrope Inclosure Act 1765	5 Geo. 3. c. 27 Pr.	19 April 1765
An Act for dividing and enclosing certain Common Fields, Meadows, and Common Pastures, in the Township and Parish of Newton in the County of Lincoln, and certain Rights of Pasture in Kettlethorpe in the said County.
Wellingborough Inclosure Act 1765	5 Geo. 3. c. 28 Pr.	19 April 1765
An Act for dividing and enclosing the Common Fields, Common Meadows, Common Pastures Common Grounds, and Waste Grounds, of and in the Manor of Wellingborough, and of and in the Manor of Wellingborough formerly belonging to the College of Irtlingborough, and in the Parish of Wellingborough, in the County of Northampton.
Lowdham Inclosure Act 1765	5 Geo. 3. c. 29 Pr.	19 April 1765
An Act for dividing and enclosing the Open Common Fields and Meadows, Common Pastures, and other Commonable Lands, lying within the Parish of Lowdham, in the County of Nottingham.
Benton Inclosure Act 1765	5 Geo. 3. c. 30 Pr.	19 April 1765
An Act for dividing and enclosing several Open and Common Fields, Lands, and Grounds, in the Parish of Benton, in the East Riding of the County of York.
Ellerker Inclosure Act 1765	5 Geo. 3. c. 31 Pr.	19 April 1765
An Act for dividing and enclosing certain Open Common Fields, Lands, and Grounds, in Ellerker, in the Parish of Brantingham, in the East Riding of the County of York.
Brantingham Inclosure Act 1765	5 Geo. 3. c. 32 Pr.	19 April 1765
An Act for dividing and enclosing certain Open Common Fields, Lands, and Grounds, in Brantingham and Thorpe Brantingham, in the Parish of Brantingham, in the East Riding of the County of York.
Draycot Inclosure Act 1765	5 Geo. 3. c. 33 Pr.	19 April 1765
An Act for dividing and enclosing the Open and Common Fields, Heath, and Waste Grounds, and Commonable Places, in the Lordship and Liberties of Draycot, in the Parish of Bourton, in the County of Warwick.
Denford Inclosure Act 1765	5 Geo. 3. c. 34 Pr.	19 April 1765
An Act for dividing and enclosing the Common Fields and Common Grounds in the Manor and Parish of Denford, in the County of Northampton.
Twywell Inclosure Act 1765	5 Geo. 3. c. 35 Pr.	19 April 1765
An Act for dividing and enclosing the Open and Common Fields, Common Meadows, Common Pastures, and Commonable Waste Grounds, in the Manor and Parish of Twywell, in the County of Northampton.
Snitfield or Snitterfield (Warwickshire) Inclosure Act 1765	5 Geo. 3. c. 36 Pr.	19 April 1765
An Act for dividing and enclosing the Open and Common Fields, Common Meadows, and other Commonable Lands, within the Manor and Parish of Snitfield, otherwise Snitterfield, in the County of Warwick.
Bretferton Inclosure Act 1765	5 Geo. 3. c. 37 Pr.	19 April 1765
An Act for dividing and enclosing the Open Lands and Grounds lying in the Parish of Bretferton, in the County of Worcester.
Rothwell Inclosure Act 1765	5 Geo. 3. c. 38 Pr.	19 April 1765
An Act for dividing and enclosing the Common Fields, Commons, and Waste Grounds, in the Parish of Rothwell, in the County of Lincoln.
Lenchwick and Norton, and Evesham (Worcestershire) Inclosure Act 1765	5 Geo. 3. c. 39 Pr.	19 April 1765
An Act for dividing and enclosing the Common Fields and Grounds lying in the Parish of Lenchwick and Norton and the Borough of Evesham, in the County of Worcester.
Doncaster, Cantley, Rossington and Wadworth (Yorkshire East Riding) inclosure and drainage.	5 Geo. 3. c. 40 Pr.	19 April 1765
An Act for dividing and enclosing certain Pieces or Parcels of Land, in the Parishes of Doncaster and Cantley; and for draining and preserving the said Lands, and also several other Lands and Grounds, in the several Parishes of Rossington and Wadworth, in the West Riding of the County of York.
Sebergham Inclosure Act 1765	5 Geo. 3. c. 41 Pr.	19 April 1765
An Act for confirming the Allotments of, and for enclosing, the Common and several Waste Lands in the Manor and Parish of Sebraham, otherwise Sebergham, in the County of Cumberland.
Scarning Inclosure Act 1765	5 Geo. 3. c. 42 Pr.	19 April 1765
An Act for dividing and enclosing the Common called Scarning Common, and the Greens called Found Green, Pope’s Green, and Bett’s Green, lying within the several Manors of Scarning Hall, Drayton Hall, and Northern Hall, Scarning Parva, Guntons, and Rougholme on the Part of Hoe, or some or One of them, and in the Parish of Seaming, in the County of Norfolk.
Spratton Inclosure Act 1765	5 Geo. 3. c. 43 Pr.	19 April 1765
An Act for dividing and enclosing the Common Fields, Common Pastures, Common Meadows, Common Grounds, and Waste Grounds, of and in the Parish and Liberties of Spratton, in the County of Northampton.
Cropton Inclosure Act 1765	5 Geo. 3. c. 44 Pr.	19 April 1765
An Act for dividing and enclosing the Commons and Waste Grounds within the Manor of Cropton, in the County of York; and for other Purposes therein mentioned.
Appleton and Lymm Inclosure Act 1765	5 Geo. 3. c. 45 Pr.	19 April 1765
An Act for dividing, allotting, and enclosing, divers Parcels of Common or Waste Grounds within the Manors of Appleton and Lymm, in the County of Chester.
Kirkhammerton Inclosure Act 1765	5 Geo. 3. c. 46 Pr.	19 April 1765
An Act for enclosing and dividing several Lands and Grounds in the Township of Kirkhammerton, in the Parish of Kirkhammerton, in the County of York.
Confirming and establishing an exchange agreed between Thomas Holles Duke of Newcastle and Margaret Cavendish Duchess Dowager of Portland for parts of their estates in Nottinghamshire.	5 Geo. 3. c. 47 Pr.	19 April 1765
An Act for confirming and establishing an Exchange agreed to be made, between Thomas Holies Duke of Newcastle and Margaret Cavendish Dutchess Dowager of Portland, of several Parts of their settled Estates in the County of Nottingham; and for settling the Lands given in Exchange to each Party to such Uses as the Lands for which the same are exchanged flood settled.
Clare Hall Cambridge Estate Act 1765	5 Geo. 3. c. 48 Pr.	19 April 1765
An Act for vesting an Estate called Woodlands, in the County of Wilts, belonging to the Matter, Fellows, and Scholars, of the College called Clarehall in the University of Cambridge, in William Earl of Shelburne and his Heirs.
Confirming and establishing and rendering more effectual an agreement for exchange of lands in Stoke Poges (Buckinghamshire) between Stoke Poges hospital and Thomas Penn.	5 Geo. 3. c. 49 Pr.	19 April 1765
An Act for confirming and establishing an Agreement, between the Matter, Brethren, and Sisters, of the Hospital of the Lord Hastings of Loughborough, founded at Stoke Poges in the County of Berks, and Thomas Penn Esquire, for exchanging certain Lands and Premises in Stoke Poges aforesaid; and for rendering the said Agreement more effectual for the Purposes thereby intended.
Fowler's Estate Act 1765	5 Geo. 3. c. 50 Pr.	19 April 1765
An Act to enable Fanny Fowler Spinster, a Minor, to convey, assign, and settle, her Real and Personal Estate, in the Manner therein mentioned, on her intended Marriage with Sir Brooke Bridges Baronet.
Sale of lands in Kent settled by rector of St. George Bloomsbury (Middlesex) and applying the proceeds for his benefit.	5 Geo. 3. c. 51 Pr.	19 April 1765
An Act for Sale of certain Lands in the County of Kent, settled upon the Rector of the Parish of Saint George Bloomsbury, in the County of Middlesex; and for applying the Money arising thereby in Manner therein mentioned, for the Benefit of the said Rector.
Applying the proceeds of a house sale in Tetbury (Gloucestershire) and other donations for the rebuilding of the parish church.	5 Geo. 3. c. 52 Pr.	19 April 1765
An Act to apply a Certain Sum of Money, arising by the Sale of a House in Tetbury, in the County of Gloucester, and by Donations of several Persons, for re-building the Parish Church and Chancel of Tetbury aforesaid.
Dobinson's Estate Act 1765	5 Geo. 3. c. 53 Pr.	19 April 1765
An Act for the Sale of Lands and Tenements in the County of Cumberland, late the Estate of William Dobinson Gentleman deceased, for the Benefit of the Children of Joseph Banks, his Nephew, deceased.
Nixon's Divorce Act 1765	5 Geo. 3. c. 54 Pr.	19 April 1765
An Act to dissolve the Marriage of John Nixon with Hester Spencer his now Wile; and to enable him to marry again; and for other Purposes therein mentioned.
Price's Name Act 1765	5 Geo. 3. c. 55 Pr.	19 April 1765
An Act to enable Brigg Price Esquire and his Issue to take and use the Surname of Fountaine, and to bear the Arms of Sir Andrew Fountaine Knight, deceased.
Townsend's Naturalization Act 1765	5 Geo. 3. c. 56 Pr.	19 April 1765
An Act for naturalizing Henrietta Rosa Peregrina Townshend, Wife of James Townshend Esquire.
Naturalization of John His, John Ernst, John Platz, and Rudolph Lemann.	5 Geo. 3. c. 57 Pr.	19 April 1765
An Act for naturalizing John His, John Henry Ernst, John Michael Platz, and Rudolph Lemann.
Naturalization of Charles Hempel, James Janot, Christopher Schultz, John Klatz, Erdmann Rieman and Bernard Fleischmann.	5 Geo. 3. c. 58 Pr.	19 April 1765
An Act for naturalizing Charles Frederick Hempel, James Janot, Christopher John Schultz, John Gottfried Klotz, Erdmann Christopher Riemann, and Bernhard Johann Fleischmann.
Houghton on the Hill Inclosure Act 1765	5 Geo. 3. c. 59 Pr.	10 May 1765
An Act for dividing and enclosing the Open Fields and Commonable Places in the Parish of Houghton on the Hill, in the County of Leicester.
Walkden Moor and Chat Moss Inclosure Act 1765	5 Geo. 3. c. 60 Pr.	10 May 1765
An Act for dividing and enclosing Walkden Moor, and a Part of a Parcel of Moss Ground, called Chatmoss, within the Manor of Worsley, in the County Palatine of Lancaster.
Burton Overy Inclosure Act 1765	5 Geo. 3. c. 61 Pr.	10 May 1765
An Act for dividing and enclosing the Open Fields, Common Pastures, and other Commonable Places, in Burton Overy, in the County of Leicester.
Aukborough Inclosure Act 1765	5 Geo. 3. c. 62 Pr.	10 May 1765
An Act for dividing and enclosing several Lands and Grounds in the Parish of Auckborough, in the County of Lincoln.
Emload Inclosure Act 1765	5 Geo. 3. c. 63 Pr.	10 May 1765
An Act for dividing and enclosing several Common Fields, Common Meadows, and Waste Grounds, in the Parish of Emload, in the County of Worcester.
Wolsingham Inclosure Act 1765	5 Geo. 3. c. 64 Pr.	10 May 1765
An Act for dividing and enclosing certain Moors or Commons in the Parish of Wolsingham, in the County Palatine of Durham.
Hartshorn Inclosure Act 1765	5 Geo. 3. c. 65 Pr.	10 May 1765
An Act for dividing and enclosing several Open and Common Fields, Common Meadows, Commons, and Waste Grounds, within the Manor and Parish of Hartshorn, in the County of Derby.
Tetford Inclosure Act 1765	5 Geo. 3. c. 66 Pr.	10 May 1765
An Act for enclosing and dividing the Open Common Fields, Meadows, Pastures, and Common Grounds, in the Manor and Parish of Tetford, in the County of Lincoln.
Wilford Inclosure Act 1765	5 Geo. 3. c. 67 Pr.	10 May 1765
An Act for dividing and enclosing several Open Fields, Meadows, and Commons, within the Lordship or Liberty of Wilford, in the County of Nottingham.
Grimston Inclosure Act 1765	5 Geo. 3. c. 68 Pr.	10 May 1765
An Act for dividing and enclosing the Open and Common Fields, and all the Commonable Lands and Grounds, in Grimston, in the County of Leicester.
Warke Inclosure Act 1765	5 Geo. 3. c. 69 Pr.	10 May 1765
An Act for dividing and enclosing Two Moors or Commons within the Barony and Manor of Warke, and Parish of Symondburn, in the County of Northumberland.
North and South Cockerington (Lincolnshire) Inclosure Act 1765	5 Geo. 3. c. 70 Pr.	10 May 1765
An Act for dividing and enclosing certain Open Common Arable Fields in the Parishes of North Cockerington and South Cockerington, in the County of Lincoln.
Keelby and Stallingborough (Lincolnshire) Inclosure Act 1765	5 Geo. 3. c. 71 Pr.	10 May 1765
An Act for dividing and enclosing certain Open and Common Fields and Grounds within the several Parishes of Keelby and Stallingborough, in the County of Lincoln.
Carlton upon Trent Inclosure Act 1765	5 Geo. 3. c. 72 Pr.	10 May 1765
An Act for dividing and enclosing the Common Fields and Common Pasture, Common Meadow, Common Grounds, and Waste Grounds, in the Manor and Lordship of Carlton upon Trent, in the County of Nottingham.
Aslackby and Dowsby (Lincolnshire) inclosure and drainage.	5 Geo. 3. c. 73 Pr.	10 May 1765
An Act for dividing and enclosing a certain Common Fen in the Parishes of Aslackby and Dowsby, in the County of Lincoln; and for draining and improving the said Fen, and also certain Enclosed Low Grounds adjoining to the said Fen.
Branston Inclosure Act 1765	5 Geo. 3. c. 74 Pr.	10 May 1765
An Act for dividing and enclosing the Fen Grounds, Moors, Sheepwalks, Wood Ings, Sike Closes, Open and Common Fields, and other Commonable Lands and Grounds, in the Parish of Branston, in the County of the City of Lincoln.
Granburrow Inclosure Act 1765	5 Geo. 3. c. 75 Pr.	10 May 1765
An Act for dividing and enclosing the Open and Common Fields, Common Pastures, Common Meadows, Common Grounds, and Waste Ground, in the Lordship and Liberties of Granburrow, in the County of Warwick.
Long Buckby Inclosure Act 1765	5 Geo. 3. c. 76 Pr.	10 May 1765
An Act for dividing and enclosing the Common Fields, Common Pastures, Common Meadows, Common Grounds, Waste Grounds, and Commonable Lands, of and in the Manor and Parish and Liberties of Long Buckby, in the County of Northampton, exclusive of that Part of the Hamlet of Murcot, which lies in the said Parish.
Bulbeck Inclosure Act 1765	5 Geo. 3. c. 77 Pr.	10 May 1765
An Act for dividing and enclosing a certain Common Moor, or Tract of Waste Land, within the Barony or Manor of Bulbeck, in the County of Northumberland.
Extinguishing rights of common in Lutcham (alias Litcham) (Norfolk).	5 Geo. 3. c. 78 Pr.	10 May 1765
An Act for extinguishing certain Rights of Common in the Parish of Lutcham, alias Litcham, in the County of Norfolk.
Austerfield Inclosure Act 1765	5 Geo. 3. c. 79 Pr.	10 May 1765
An Act for enclosing and dividing the High and Low Commons of Austerfield, in the County of York.
Wadwoth Inclosure Act 1765	5 Geo. 3. c. 80 Pr.	10 May 1765
An Act for dividing and enclosing the several Open Arable Fields, Undivided Enclosures, Commons, and Wastes, lying and being within the Parish of Wadworth, in the West Riding of the County of York.
Ashford and Sheldon Inclosure Act 1765	5 Geo. 3. c. 81 Pr.	10 May 1765
An Act for dividing and enclosing the several Fields, Meadows, Pastures, Commons, and Waste Grounds, within the Hamlets of Ashford and Sheldon, in the Parish of Bakewell, and County of Derby.
Elford Inclosure Act 1765	5 Geo. 3. c. 82 Pr.	10 May 1765
An Act for dividing and enclosing the Common Fields, Common Meadows, and other Commonable Lands and Grounds, in the Manor and Parish of Elford, in the County of Stafford.
Somerton Inclosure Act 1765	5 Geo. 3. c. 83 Pr.	10 May 1765
An Act for dividing and enclosing a certain Open Common Field, Common Pastures, Common Meadows, and Waste Grounds, in the Manor and Parish of Somerton, in the County of Oxford.
Shutford Inclosure Act 1765	5 Geo. 3. c. 84 Pr.	10 May 1765
An Act for dividing and enclosing the Open and Common Field, Common Meadows, Common Pastures, Common Grounds, and Commonable Lands, lying within the Township and Hamlet of Shutford, in the Parish of Swalcliffe, in the County of Oxford.
Tickhill Inclosure Act 1765	5 Geo. 3. c. 85 Pr.	10 May 1765
An Act for dividing and enclosing certain Commons, called The High and Low Commons, in the Parish of Tickhill, in the Counties of York and Nottingham.
Black Sluice Drainage Act 1765 or the Black Sluice Act 1765	5 Geo. 3. c. 86 Pr.	10 May 1765
An Act for draining and improving certain Low Marsh and Fen Lands, lying between Boston Haven and Bourn, in the Parts of Kesteven and Holland, in the County of Lincoln.
Countess Dowager of Burlington's Estate Act 1765	5 Geo. 3. c. 87 Pr.	10 May 1765
An Act for vesting Part of the settled Estates of Dorothy late Countess Dowager of Burlington, lying in the Counties of Middlesex, York, and Lincoln, in Trustees, to be sold, and conveyed in Manner therein mentioned; and for investing Part of the Money arising by such Sale in discharging a Mortgage Debt affecting the same Premises, and the Residue thereof in the Purchase of other Manors, Lands, and Hereditaments, to be settled to the same Uses, as the said settled Estates do now stand limited, or so many of them as shall be then existing.
Sale of John Saint John's and Edmund Dering's undivided shares in Isle of Thanet (Kent) and purchase of other lands with the proceeds for their use.	5 Geo. 3. c. 88 Pr.	10 May 1765
An Act for vesting certain undivided Parts, or Shares, belonging to the Honourable John Saint John an Infant, and Edward Dering also an Infant, of and in several Messuages, Lands, and Hereditaments, in the Isle of Thanet, in the County of Kent, in Trustees, to be sold; and for laying out the Money arising by the Sale thereof in the Purchase of other Lands, to be conveyed to the Use of the said John Saint John and Edward Dering respectively, and their respective Heirs; and for other Purposes therein mentioned.
Making the portions provided by Sir George and Dame Julia Trevelyan's marriage settlement for their children, so they may be paid and raised notwithstanding the deaths of such children in their father's lifetime.	5 Geo. 3. c. 89 Pr.	10 May 1765
An Act for making the Portions provided by the Marriage Settlement of Sir George Trevelyan Baronet and Dame Julia his Wife, for their Younger Children, vested Interests, so that the same may be raised and paid, notwithstanding the Deaths of such Children in the Life-time of their Father; and for other Purposes therein mentioned.
Vernon's Estate Act 1765	5 Geo. 3. c. 90 Pr.	10 May 1765
An Act for vesting the Barony or Manor of Shipbrook, in the County of Chester, Part of the Estate of Henry Vernon Esquire, comprised in his Marriage Settlement, in Trustees, to be sold, for raising Money to discharge the Debts and Encumbrances charged upon and affecting the same previous to the said Settlement; and for other Purposes therein mentioned.
Dolman's Estate Act 1765	5 Geo. 3. c. 91 Pr.	10 May 1765
An Act for selling Part of the settled Estates of Robert Dolman Esquire, in Pocklington and elsewhere, in the County of York, for discharging the Debts and Encumbrances of himself and Robert Dolman the Younger, his Eldest Son, affecting the same; and for making Provision for Robert Dolman the Younger, and for the Younger Children of Robert Dolman the Elder.
Crowe's Estate Act 1765	5 Geo. 3. c. 92 Pr.	10 May 1765
An Act for vesting Part of the settled Estates of Christopher Crowe Esquire, in the County of York, in him, in Fee Simple; and for settling other Estates, in the same County, in Lieu thereof.
Knowsley's Estate Act 1765	5 Geo. 3. c. 93 Pr.	10 May 1765
An Act for vesting the settled Estate of John Knowsley and Elizabeth his Wise, in the County of York, in Trustees, to be conveyed, pursuant to certain Articles, for the Purchase thereof; and for laying out the Money thereby stipulated to be paid in the Purchase of other Lands, to be charged and settled in Manner as therein mentioned.
Cary's Estate Act 1765	5 Geo. 3. c. 94 Pr.	10 May 1765
An Act for vesting certain Estates late of Elizabeth Cary Widow, deceased, in the County of Middlesex, in Trustees, in Trust, to sell and convey the same to Robert Child Esquire; and for laying out the Money arising by such Sale, in Three per Centum Consolidated Bank Annuities, to be secured and transferred in Manner therein mentioned; and for other Purposes.
Westbrooke's Estate Act 1765	5 Geo. 3. c. 95 Pr.	10 May 1765
An Act for divesting out of the Heir at Law, or other legal Representative or Representative of Edmund Neeler, deceased, the several Freehold Estates of the late William Westbrook Esquire, deceased, in the Counties of Middlesex, Bucks, Kent, and Surrey, and in the City of London; and for vesting the same in Trustees, to be sold and conveyed to such Persons as may already have contracted, or shall hereafter contract, to become the Purchasers of any Parts or Shares thereof, under the Directions of the Court of Chancery.
Taylor's Estate Act 1765	5 Geo. 3. c. 96 Pr.	10 May 1765
An Act for Sale of the Copyhold Estates late of Doctor Robert Taylor, deceased; and for laying out the Money arising thereby in the Purchase of other Lands and Hereditaments, to be settled in Lieu thereof; and for other the Purposes therein mentioned.
Confirming and establishing exchanges of land between Charles Howard and Edward Walter and Charles Howard and Jonathon Tyers.	5 Geo. 3. c. 97 Pr.	10 May 1765
An Act to confirm and establish Exchanges of Land, at Dorking in Surrey, between Charles Howard Esquire and Edward Walter Esquire, and between the said Charles Howard and Jonathan Tyers Esquire.
Phelps' Estate Act 1765	5 Geo. 3. c. 98 Pr.	10 May 1765
An Act for vesting Part of the Real Estate of Mary Phelps Widow, deceased, given and devised by her Will, in Trustees, to be sold, for Payment of Debts, Legacies, and Encumbrances.
Hollingworth's Estate Act 1765	5 Geo. 3. c. 99 Pr.	10 May 1765
An Act for vesting several Freehold and Copyhold Estates, in the several Counties of Essex, Suffolk, Bucks, and Middlesex, and in the City of London, in Trustees, for the Sale thereof, in order to discharge the several Legacies or Portions bequeathed by the Will of William Hollingworth Esquire, deceased; and for other Purposes therein mentioned.
Bristow's Estate Act 1765	5 Geo. 3. c. 100 Pr.	10 May 1765
An Act for Sale of the Estates comprised in the Marriage Settlement of John Bristow Esquire, it the County of Norfolk; and for applying the Monies arising thereby in the Purchase of other Lands and Hereditaments, to be settled to the Uses contained in the said Settlement.
Ayscough's Estate Act 1765	5 Geo. 3. c. 101 Pr.	10 May 1765
An Act for making a Partition of divers Lands and Hereditaments, in the Counties of Lincoln and York, late the Estate of Edward Ayscough, deceased, which, upon his Death, belonged to his Four Daughters and Coheirs; and for settling the Lands and Hereditaments to be allotted upon the said Partition to the several Uses limited of their several undivided Shares thereof respectively.
Broxolme's Estate Act 1765	5 Geo. 3. c. 102 Pr.	10 May 1765
An Act for Sale of the Freehold Estate late of Amie Broxolme Widow, deceased, in the Parish of Saint George, Hanover Square and for laying out the Money arising by such Sale In the Purchase of other Freehold Lands and Hereditaments, to be settled in Lieu thereof.
Naturalization of Louisa Rudolphina and Gregory Wale.	5 Geo. 3. c. 103 Pr.	10 May 1765
An Act for naturalizing Louisa Rudolphina Wale and Gregory Wale.
Wagner's Naturalization Act 1765	5 Geo. 3. c. 104 Pr.	10 May 1765
An Act to naturalize Benedict Paul Wagner.
Winn's Naturalization Act 1765	5 Geo. 3. c. 105 Pr.	10 May 1765
An Act for naturalizing Sabine Louisse Winn.
Marsborough Inclosure Act 1765	5 Geo. 3. c. 106 Pr.	15 May 1765
An Act for dividing and enclosing several Lands and Grounds, Undivided Enclosures, Commons, and Wastes, in or near the Village or Hamlet of Marsborough, in the Township of Kimberworth, and in the Parish of Rotherham, in the County of York.
Scalford Inclosure Act 1765	5 Geo. 3. c. 107 Pr.	15 May 1765
An Act for dividing and enclosing the Open and Common Fields and Common Pastures of Scalford, in the County of Leicester, and all the Lands and Grounds within the same Fields.
Felmersham Inclosure Act 1765	5 Geo. 3. c. 108 Pr.	15 May 1765
An Act for dividing and enclosing the Open and Common Fields, Common Meadows, Common Pastures, and other Commonable Lands and Grounds, in the Parish of Felmersham, in the County of Bedford.
Earl of Carlisle's Estate Act 1765	5 Geo. 3. c. 109 Pr.	15 May 1765
An Act for vesting divers Manors, Lands, and Hereditaments, in the Counties of York, Cumberland, Northumberland, and Durham, late the Estate of Henry Earl of Carlisle, deceased, in Trustees, to be sold and disposed of, in and for the Payment of his Debts, Legacies, and Encumbrances, and other the Purposes in his Will mentioned.
Bellew's Estate Act 1765	5 Geo. 3. c. 110 Pr.	15 May 1765
An Act to enable John Lord Bellew Baron of Duleek in the Kingdom of Ireland more effectually to exercise his Power to raise certain Sums therein mentioned, out of his settled Estates in the said Kingdom, for the Portions of Younger Children.
Wyche's Estate Act 1765	5 Geo. 3. c. 111 Pr.	15 May 1765
An Act for vesting the Estate late of Peter Wyche Esquire, at Goadby, alias Godeby Marwood, in the County of Leicester, in Trust, to be conveyed to the most Noble John Marquis of Granby, or as he shall appoint; and for applying the Purchase-money in Manner, and for the Purposes, therein mentioned.
Syresham Inclosure Act 1765	5 Geo. 3. c. 112 Pr.	25 May 1765
An Act for dividing and enclosing the Common Fields, Common Pastures, Common Meadows, Common Grounds, and Commonable Lands, within the Manor or Manors and Parish of Syresham, otherwise Siseham, in the County of Northampton.
Braithwell Inclosure Act 1765	5 Geo. 3. c. 113 Pr.	25 May 1765
An Act for dividing and enclosing certain Common Fields and Waste Ground, in the Parish of Bratthinell, in the County of York.
Jeremiah Rayment the younger (and issue): change of name and arms to Hadsley, pursuant to the will of Robert Hadsley.	5 Geo. 3. c. 114 Pr.	25 May 1765
An Act to enable Jeremiah Rayment the Younger Esquire, and his Issue, to take and use the Surname and Arms of Hadsley, pursuant to the Will of Robert Hadsley Esquire, deceased.
Naturalization of Henry de Missy and Gabriel Le Royer.	5 Geo. 3. c. 115 Pr.	25 May 1765
An Act for naturalizing Henry de Massy and Gabriel le Rayer.

=== Sources ===
- "5 George III - 1765". The Statutes at Large. Vol. 26. 1762. pp. 163–520 – via Internet Archive.
- "5 George III - 1765". The Statutes at Large. Vol. 26. 1764. pp. 163–520 – via Google Books.
- "5 George III - 1765". The Statutes at Large. Vol. 26. 1762 – via Internet Archive.
- "5 George III - 1765". The Statutes at Large. Vol. 26. Cambridge, Printed by Joseph Bentham. 1762 – via Internet Archive.
- "5 George III - 1765". The Statutes at Large. Vol. 26. Cambridge, Printed by J. Bentham. 1762 – via Internet Archive.
- Journals of the House of Commons. Vol. 30. London: His Majesty's Stationery Office. 1803. pp. 3–435.
- Chronological Table of and Index to the Statutes. Vol. 1: To the End of the Session 59 Vict. Sess. 2 (1895) (13th ed.). London: Her Majesty's Stationery Office. 1896. pp. 122–123 – via Google Books.
- "Acts of the Parliament of Great Britain from 1765". legislation.gov.uk. The National Archives.

== See also ==
- List of acts of the Parliament of Great Britain
