= Algernon Griffiths =

English cricketer

Algernon Sydney Griffiths (23 May 1847 – 18 April 1899) was an English first-class cricketer active between 1867 and 1873, who played two matches for Middlesex and also represented the Marylebone Cricket Club (MCC). The son of Letitia (née Chatfield) and George Richard Griffiths, he was born in Marylebone and educated at Eton College. He attended the Royal Military Academy, Woolwich as a gentleman cadet, and is known to have represented them in a cricket match against a team of Surrey gentlemen at the Oval in June 1866, scoring 84 runs. After passing out from the Academy, in 1868 he was given a commission as a lieutenant in the British Army. In August 1873, he played for the MCC against Kent at Canterbury, but his career lay in the military. He was promoted to the rank of captain in 1879, then major in 1884, and lieutenant-colonel in 1894. At the time of his death (from pneumonia) in West Kensington, he was a brevet colonel in command of the Royal Artillery at Sheerness. His brother, Herbert, was also a first-class cricketer.
