= Herbert Griffiths (cricketer) =

English cricketer and physician

Personal information
- Full name: Herbert Tyrrell Griffiths
- Born: 10 August 1853; Ryde, Isle of Wight, England
- Died: 3 November 1905 (aged 52); Preston Candover, Hampshire, England
- Batting: Right-handed
- Relatives: Algernon Griffiths (brother); Richard Garth (father-in-law)

Domestic team information
- Years: Team
- 1876–1878: Marylebone Cricket Club

Career statistics
Competition	First-class
Matches	2
Runs scored	84
Batting average	42.00
100s/50s	–/1
Top score	68*
Catches/stumpings	1/–
- Source: Cricinfo, 26 August 2021

Herbert Tyrrell Griffiths (10 August 1853 – 3 November 1905) was an English first-class cricketer and medical practitioner.

The son of George Richard Griffiths and Letitia Chatfield, he was born at Ryde on the Isle of Wight in August 1853. He was educated at Eton College, before going up to Trinity College, Cambridge, where he studied medicine. While studying at Cambridge, Griffiths did not play first-class cricket for Cambridge University Cricket Club, but did represent the Marylebone Cricket Club in two first-class matches at Lord's in 1876 and 1878 against Surrey and Hampshire respectively. Against Surrey he scored an unbeaten 68. Griffiths gained his MA in 1879 and his MD in 1884.

Griffiths was the Herbert Exhibitioner and Martin Medallist at the Army Medical School at Netley Hospital. He was appointed a surgeon to the Bengal Army in April 1881, later resigning from the post in June 1883. He held the posts of physician at the Seaman's Hospital in Greenwich and was later a house physician and medical registrar at St George's Hospital. He was also a physicians assistant at the Royal Brompton Hospital, a clinical assistant at the Central Throat Hospital and surgeon to the Kensington Dispensary. Griffiths ran a private practice in partnership with a Mr. Merriman of Kensington Square, until Merriman's death. Following his death, he ran the practice by himself for two years, the stress of which was attributed to him moving from Kensington to the rural Hampshire village of Preston Candover in 1904. His departure from Kensington caused genuine distress to his patients, who held him in high regard. His hobbies included music, with Griffiths writing several songs. He died from pleuropneumonia at Preston Candover in November 1905. Griffiths had been married to Eveline Selina May, daughter of Richard Garth, since 1887. His brother, Algernon, was also a first-class cricketer.
