= Saint-Romain-de-Colbosc tramway =

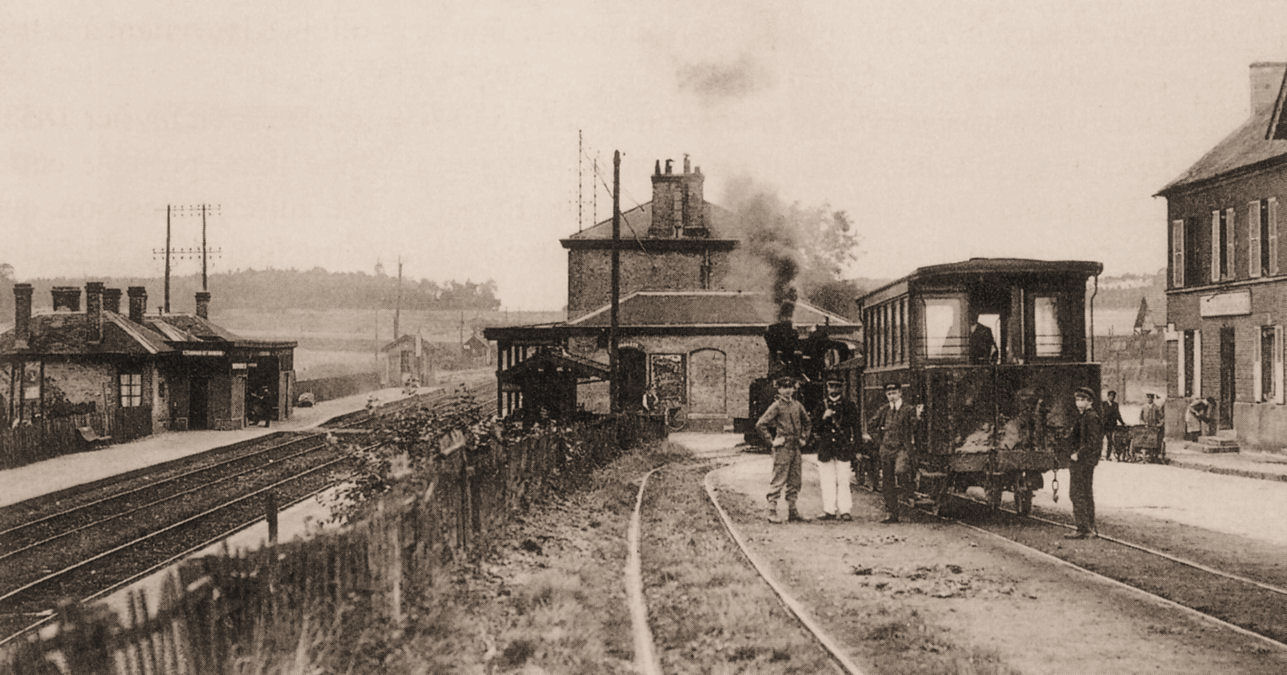
A view of the tramway in Étainhus station from 1900–1905

The Saint-Romain-de-Colbosc tramway was a tramway system serving the city of Saint-Romain-de-Colbosc, Seine-Maritime, France.

Inaugurated in 1896, the network ran out of money following World War I and was closed in 1929.
