= Iron Act =

Act of the Parliament of Great Britain regulating American colonial trade

Importation, etc. Act 1749
- Act of Parliament
- Parliament of Great Britain
- Long title: An Act to encourage the importation of pig and bar iron from his Majesty's colonies in America; and to prevent the erection of any mill or other engine for slitting or rolling of iron; or any plateing forge to work with a tilt hammer; or any furnace for making steel, in any of the said colonies.
- Citation: 23 Geo. 2. c. 29
- Territorial extent: Great Britain; British America

Dates
- Royal assent: 12 April 1750
- Commencement: 24 June 1750 (Note: Section 1.)
- Repealed: 15 July 1867
Other legislation
Amended by	Importation Act 1757; Customs, etc. Act 1765; Customs Law Repeal Act 1825
Repealed by	Statute Law Revision Act 1867
Relates to	Trade and Navigation Acts

Status: Repealed

Text of statute as originally enacted

The Iron Act, also called the Importation, etc. Act 1749 (23 Geo. 2. c. 29), was an act of the Parliament of Great Britain, which was one of the legislative measures introduced within the system of Trade and Navigation Acts. The act sought to increase the importation of pig and bar iron from its American colonies and to prevent the building of iron-related production facilities within these colonies, particularly in North America where these raw materials were identified. The dual purpose of the act was to increase manufacturing capacity within Great Britain itself, and to limit potential competition from the colonies possessing the raw materials.

== The act ==
The act repealed the duties on pig iron and bar iron imported from British America and imported into London respectively. Bar iron might be carried coastwise or by land from there to Royal Navy dockyards, but otherwise not beyond 10 miles from London. The iron must be marked with its place of origin, with most, if not all, pig iron was already marked. It also stipulated that no mill or engine for slitting or rolling iron or any plating forge to work with a tilt hammer or any furnace for making steel was to be built in the American colonies, and for what mills already existed Colonial governors were required to certify them.

== Analysis ==
Pig iron had been exported from Virginia and Maryland since the 1720s, but little came from other colonies, nor did bar iron. The continuance of this was encouraged, as was the production and export of bar iron (which required a finery forge using a helve hammer not a trip hammer).

Conversely, the act was designed to restrict the colonial manufacture of finished iron products and steel. Existing works could continue in operation, but no expansion would be possible in the output of:

- knives, scythes, sickles and other edged tools as a tilt hammer would be needed to produce thin iron, and a steel furnace to make steel.
- nails which were made from rod iron, from a slitting mill.
- Tinplate, which required a rolling mill. This was the raw material from which tinsmiths made a wide variety of goods from tinned sheet iron.

This was a continuation of a long term British policy, beginning with the Navigation Acts, which were designed to direct most American trade to England, and later Great Britain, and to encourage the manufacture of goods for export to the colonies in Britain.

The act, if enforced, would have severely limited the emerging iron manufacturing industry (as opposed to the production of cast or bar iron) in the colonies. However, as with other trade legislation, enforcement was poor because no one had any significant incentive to ensure compliance. Nevertheless, this was one of a number of measures restrictive on the trade of British Colonies in North America that were one of the causes of the American Revolution.

Part of the reason for lax enforcement may be due to the involvement of Colonial Officials in iron works. Virginia Governors Gooch and Spotswood were both deeply involved in iron manufacture. Gooch was a part owner of the Fredericksville Ironworks. Spotswood owned Tubal Ironworks (a blast furnace and probably finery forge) and the double air furnace at Massaponnax. Other prominent members of the Virginia aristocracy and House of Burgesses involved in the iron industry included John Tayloe II (Bristol Iron Works, near Fredericksburg; Neabsco Iron Works; and Occoquan Ironworks), Augustine Washington, George's father (Accoceek/Potomac Ironworks), and Benjamin Grimes (Grimes Recovery and a bloomery near Fredericksburg).

== Subsequent developments ==
The limitation of imported bar iron to London and the dockyards was partly repealed by the Importation Act 1757 (30 Geo. 2. c. 16), with duty-free imports to any part of Great Britain being permitted. A clause requiring bar iron to be marked was similarly repealed as unnecessary. A part of the act was also repealed by the Customs, etc. Act 1765, (5 Geo. 3. c. 45). The whole act was repealed by section 1 of, and the schedule to, the Statute Law Revision Act 1867 (30 & 31 Vict. c. 59), which came into force on 15 July 1867. This repeal was due to the replacement of colonial rule with the Dominion of Canada.

== Bibliography ==
- Bining, A. C. (1933). British Regulation of the Colonial Iron Trade. Philadelphia: Univ. of Philadelphia Press. OCLC 2013136.
- King, Peter. ‘The British Iron Act of 1750’, Historical Metallurgy 54(1) (2023), 62–73.
