= Attorney General Griffith =

Attorney General Griffith may refer to:

- Samuel Griffith (1845–1920), Attorney-General of Queensland
- William Brandford Griffith (judge) (1858–1939), Attorney General of the Colony of Jamaica
- William Downes Griffith (1829–1908), Attorney General of the Cape Colony

== See also ==
- John Calvert Griffiths (born 1931), Attorney General of Hong Kong
