= Charles Griffiths (British Army officer) =

British Army general

Lieutenant-General Charles Griffiths (3 August 1763 – 31 May 1829) was a British soldier, foster brother to Prince Frederick, Duke of York and Albany, Lieutenant-General and Captain of Yarmouth Castle, Isle of Wight.

== Parents and marriage ==
Griffiths was the son of the Reverend John Griffiths and his wife Mary, the daughter of John Denham. Mary has been described as the foster-mother to the Duke of York, second son of George III. Griffiths was thirteen days older than the Duke of York and has been described in turn as the latter's foster-brother. He married on 7 June 1796 Caroline Francis, the daughter of Sir William Neville Hart and Elizabeth, the daughter of Stanhope Aspinwall. His elder brother, John Griffiths of Erryd, was a medical practitioner and surgeon to Queen Charlotte's Household 1792–1818. His elder brother's wife, Elizabeth, was the sister of his own wife.

== Military career ==
In 1779, Griffiths was appointed ensign in the 15th Regiment of Foot. He was placed on half-pay in 1783, restored to full-pay in the 40th Regiment in 1786 and appointed lieutenant in the 76th Regiment of Foot in 1787.

=== Service in India ===
During the Third Anglo-Mysore War, Griffiths served in the East Indies (i.e. India). He was present at the siege, assault, and capture of the town and fortress of Bangalore, also at the siege and storming of the hill fort of Savendroog in the general action near Seringapatam with Tippu Sultan on 15 May 1791. He was wounded in the general action on 6 February 1792, when the enemy's lines were stormed under the walls of Seringapatam and at the siege of that capital. It terminated in the peace of 19 March of that same year.

=== French Revolutionary Wars ===
Later, in 1794, Griffiths was promoted to a company in the 14th Foot and with them he participated in the French Revolutionary Wars. He served in Flanders with the army under the Duke of York, and was in the actions of 17/18 May, and at the storming of the village of Pontechin on 22 May, with the brigade under Major-General Henry Edward Fox, consisting of the 14th, 37th, and 53rd Regiments. He was in the action of Geldermansel or Geldermalsen, on the Waal, under Lord Cathcart. He was appointed major in the 82nd Regiment in 1796, and served in Ireland and Menorca with that Corps. Griffiths was promoted to lieutenant-colonel in ancient Irish Fencibles on 11 December 1800. He served with that corps in Egypt, and was present at the Siege of Alexandria.

=== Later career and the Napoleonic Wars ===
During the Napoleonic Wars, Griffiths was subsequently placed on the staff in Ireland and England, and received the brevet of colonel in 1810. In the following year he was appointed lieutenant-colonel of the 2nd Battalion of the 11th Regiment of Foot, which corps he joined at Gibraltar. He received the rank of major-general on 4 June 1813, and was placed on the staff of the garrison at Gibraltar. In the neighbouring Straits he commanded for nearly two years the British auxiliary troops in the fortress of Ceuta. He attained the rank of lieutenant-general in 1825.

In 1820 he was appointed Captain of Yarmouth Castle on the Isle of Wight, a position he held until his death in 1829.
