= Saint-Romain-de-Colbosc =

- Commune
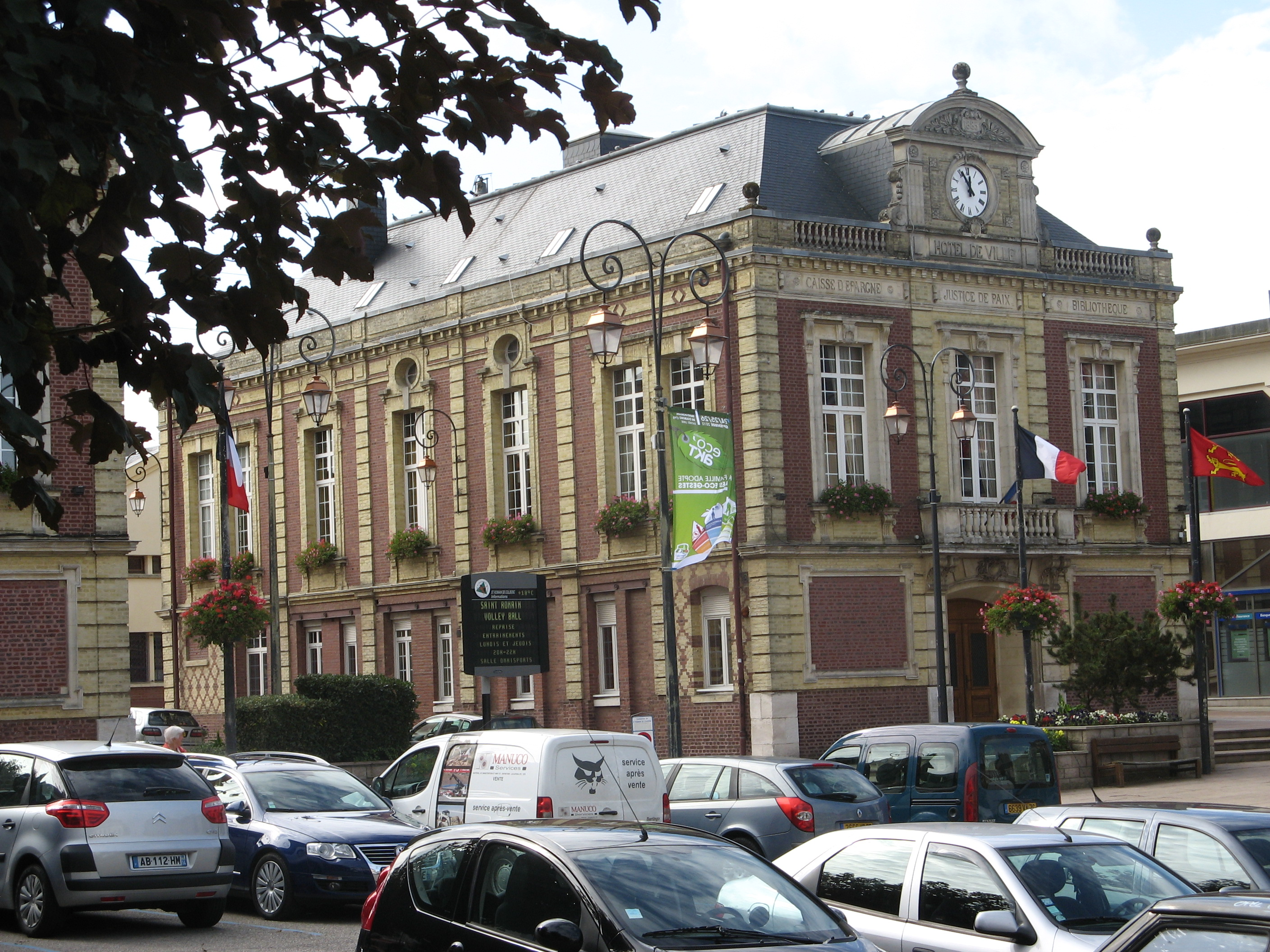
- The town hall in Saint-Romain-de-Colbosc

- Coat of arms
- Location of Saint-Romain-de-Colbosc
- Location within France Location within Normandy
- Coordinates: 49°31′55″N 0°21′28″E
- Country: France
- Region: Normandy
- Department: Seine-Maritime
- Arrondissement: Le Havre
- Canton: Saint-Romain-de-Colbosc
- Intercommunality: Le Havre Seine Métropole

Government
  - Mayor (2026–32): Clotilde Eudier
- Area^{1}: 11.74 km^{2} (4.53 sq mi)
- Elevation: 125 m (410 ft)
- Highest elevation: 130 m (430 ft)
- Lowest elevation: 48 m (157 ft)
- Population (2023): 4,780
  - Density: 407/km^{2} (1,050/sq mi)
- Time zone: UTC+01:00 (CET)
  - Summer (DST): UTC+02:00 (CEST)
- INSEE/Postal code: 76647 /76430
- ^{1} French Land Register data, which excludes lakes, ponds, glaciers > 1 km^{2} (0.386 sq mi or 247 acres) and river estuaries.

Saint-Romain-de-Colbosc (French pronunciation: [sɛ̃ ʁɔmɛ̃ də kɔlbɔsk]) is a commune in the Seine-Maritime department in the Normandy region in northern France.

== Geography ==
Saint-Romain-de-Colbosc is a small farming and light industrial town in the Pays de Caux, situated some 8 miles (13 km) east of Le Havre, at the junction of the D34 and D6015 roads.

== Population ==
Historical population
| Year | Pop. | ±% p.a. |
|---|---|---|
| 1968 | 3,003 | — |
| 1975 | 3,631 | +2.75% |
| 1982 | 3,595 | −0.14% |
| 1990 | 3,588 | −0.02% |
| 1999 | 3,937 | +1.04% |
| 2007 | 3,832 | −0.34% |
| 2012 | 3,884 | +0.27% |
| 2017 | 4,132 | +1.25% |
| 2023 | 4,780 | +2.46% |
Source: INSEE

== Places of interest ==
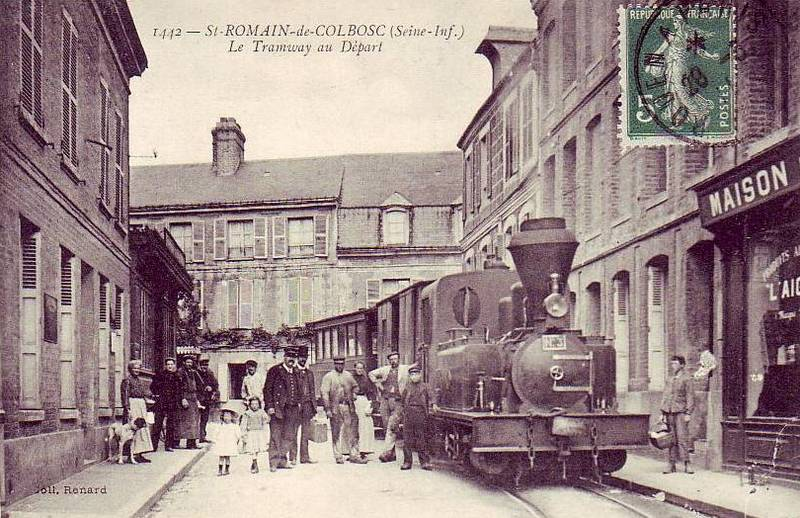
Tramway station of Saint Romain

- The eighteenth-century church
- Ruins of the chateau of Robert.
- The chateau of Grosmesnil.
- A fifteenth-century manorhouse.
- The Franco-Prussian War memorial.
- A sixteenth-century stone cross.
- The fifteenth-century porch of the old hospital.
- A Protestant church, dating from the nineteenth century.

== See also ==
- Tramway de Saint-Romain-de-Colbosc
- Communes of the Seine-Maritime department
