= List of acts of the Parliament of Great Britain from 1786 =

This is a complete list of acts of the Parliament of Great Britain for the year 1786.

For acts passed until 1707, see the list of acts of the Parliament of England and the list of acts of the Parliament of Scotland. See also the list of acts of the Parliament of Ireland.

For acts passed from 1801 onwards, see the list of acts of the Parliament of the United Kingdom. For acts of the devolved parliaments and assemblies in the United Kingdom, see the list of acts of the Scottish Parliament, the list of acts of the Northern Ireland Assembly, and the list of acts and measures of Senedd Cymru; see also the list of acts of the Parliament of Northern Ireland.

The number shown after each act's title is its chapter number. Acts are cited using this number, preceded by the year(s) of the reign during which the relevant parliamentary session was held; thus the Union with Ireland Act 1800 is cited as "39 & 40 Geo. 3. c. 67", meaning the 67th act passed during the session that started in the 39th year of the reign of George III and which finished in the 40th year of that reign. Note that the modern convention is to use Arabic numerals in citations (thus "41 Geo. 3" rather than "41 Geo. III"). Acts of the last session of the Parliament of Great Britain and the first session of the Parliament of the United Kingdom are both cited as "41 Geo. 3".

Acts passed by the Parliament of Great Britain did not have a short title; however, some of these acts have subsequently been given a short title by acts of the Parliament of the United Kingdom (such as the Short Titles Act 1896).

Before the Acts of Parliament (Commencement) Act 1793 came into force on 8 April 1793, acts passed by the Parliament of Great Britain were deemed to have come into effect on the first day of the session in which they were passed. Because of this, the years given in the list below may in fact be the year before a particular act was passed.

== 26 Geo. 3 ==
The third session of the 16th Parliament of Great Britain, which met from 24 January 1786 until 11 July 1786.

This session was also traditionally cited as 26 G. 3.

=== Public acts ===
Short title	Citation	Royal assent
Long title
Trade Act 1786 (repealed)	26 Geo. 3. c. 1	3 March 1786
An Act for confining for a limited Time the Trade between the Ports of the United States of America and His Majesty's Subjects in the Island of Newfoundland to Bread, Flour, Indian Corn, and Live Stock, to be imported in none but British-built Ships actually belonging to British Subjects, and navigated according to Law, clearing out from the Ports of His Majesty's European Dominions, and furnished with a Licence according to the Form hereunto annexed. (Repealed by Statute Law Revision Act 1871 (34 & 35 Vict. c. 116))
Exportation Act 1786 (repealed)	26 Geo. 3. c. 2	3 March 1786
An Act to continue an Act made in the last Session of Parliament, intituled, "An Act to prohibit for a limited Time the Exportation of Hay." (Note: Exportation Act 1785 (25 Geo. 3. c. 62)) (Repealed by Statute Law Revision Act 1871 (34 & 35 Vict. c. 116))
Land Tax Act 1786 (repealed)	26 Geo. 3. c. 3	3 March 1786
An Act for granting an Aid to His Majesty by a Land Tax to be raised in Great Britain, for the Service of the Year One thousand seven hundred and eighty-six. (Repealed by Statute Law Revision Act 1871 (34 & 35 Vict. c. 116))
Trade with America Act 1786 (repealed)	26 Geo. 3. c. 4	3 March 1786
An Act for further continuing for a limited Time an Act made in the Twenty-third Year of the Reign of His present Majesty, intituled, "An Act for preventing certain Instruments from being required from Ships belonging to the United States of America, and to give to His Majesty for a limited Time certain Powers for the better carrying on Trade and Commerce between the Subjects of His Majesty's Dominions and the Inhabitants of the said United States;" and for further continuing for a limited Time an Act made in the Twenty-fourth Year of the Reign of His present Majesty, (Note: Trade with British America Act 1784 (24 Geo. 3. Sess. 2. c. 45)) intituled, "An Act to extend the Powers of an Act made in the Twenty-third Year of His present Majesty, (Note: Trade with America (No. 2) Act 1783 (23 Geo. 3. c. 39)) for giving His Majesty certain Powers for the better carrying on Trade and Commerce between the Subjects of His Majesty's Dominions and the Inhabitants of the United States of America to the Trade and Commerce of this Kingdom with the British Colonies and Plantations in America," with respect to certain Articles therein mentioned. (Repealed by Statute Law Revision Act 1871 (34 & 35 Vict. c. 116))
Exportation (No. 2) Act 1786 (repealed)	26 Geo. 3. c. 5	3 March 1786
An Act to regulate the Exportation of Hops to Ireland. (Repealed by Statute Law Revision Act 1871 (34 & 35 Vict. c. 116))
Malt Duties Act 1786 (repealed)	26 Geo. 3. c. 6	3 March 1786
An Act for continuing and granting to His Majesty certain Duties upon Malt, Mum, Cyder and Perry, for the Service of the Year One thousand seven hundred and eighty-six. (Repealed by Statute Law Revision Act 1871 (34 & 35 Vict. c. 116))
Marine Mutiny Act 1786 (repealed)	26 Geo. 3. c. 7	22 March 1786
An Act for the Regulation of His Majesty's Marine Forces while on Shore. (Repealed by Statute Law Revision Act 1871 (34 & 35 Vict. c. 116))
Crew of a Certain Foreign Vessel Act 1786 (repealed)	26 Geo. 3. c. 8	22 March 1786
An Act to enable the Persons therein named, to provide proper Places on Shore for the Reception of the Crew of the Voorberg Dutch East Indiaman, forced by Stress of Weather into the Port of Dartmouth. (Note: The VOC Voorberg was damaged in a storm in December 1785, and lost its masts and rigging. It took refuge at Dartmouth, where it was quarantined for several months, during which 96 men died.) (Repealed by Statute Law Revision Act 1871 (34 & 35 Vict. c. 116))
Duties on Shops Act 1786 (repealed)	26 Geo. 3. c. 9	24 March 1786
An Act to explain and amend an Act of the last Session of Parliament, intituled, "An Act for granting to His Majesty certain Duties on Shops within Great Britain;" (Note: Duties on Shops Act 1785 (25 Geo. 3. c. 30)) for repealing several of the Duties granted by the said Act, and for granting other Duties in Lieu thereof. (Repealed by Duties on Shops Act 1789 (29 Geo. 3. c. 9))
Mutiny Act 1786 (repealed)	26 Geo. 3. c. 10	24 March 1786
An Act for punishing Mutiny and Desertion, and for the better Payment of the Army and their Quarters. (Repealed by Statute Law Revision Act 1871 (34 & 35 Vict. c. 116))
Dover Harbour Act 1786 (repealed)	26 Geo. 3. c. 11	22 March 1786
An Act for enlarging the Term of several Acts of Parliament, for the Repair of Dover Harbour. (Repealed by Dover Harbour Act 1828 (9 Geo. 4. c. xxxi))
Liverpool Improvement Act 1786 (repealed)	26 Geo. 3. c. 12	22 March 1786
An Act for opening, making, widening, and altering, certain Streets, Passages, and Places, within the Town of Liverpool, in the County Palatine of Lancaster; for supplying the said Town with fresh and wholesome Water; for removing and preventing Nuisances and Annoyances therein; for appointing additional Market Places; and for extending so much of the Powers of an Act of the Second Year of His present Majesty, (Note: Liverpool (Improvement) Act 1762 (2 Geo. 3. c. 68)) as relates to Hackney Coachmen, Chairmen, Carters, and Porters, to a certain Distance beyond the Liberties of the said Town. (Repealed by Liverpool Corporation Act 1921 (11 & 12 Geo. 5. c. lxxiv))
Alloa Harbour Act 1786 (repealed)	26 Geo. 3. c. 13	11 April 1786
An Act to amend and render more effectual, so much of an Act passed in the Twenty-seventh Year of the Reign of His late Majesty King George the Second, (Note: Alloa Beer Duties Act 1754 (27 Geo. 2. c. 35)) as imposes a Duty on Ships and Vessels anchoring in the Harbour of Alloa, in the County of Clackmannan, for repairing the Pier of the said Harbour. (Repealed by Alloa Harbour Consolidation Act 1872 (35 & 36 Vict. c. clx))
London (Coal Trade) Act 1786 (repealed)	26 Geo. 3. c. 14	11 April 1786
An Act to prevent Frauds and Abuses in the Admeasurement of Coals sold by Wharf Measure, within the several Parishes lying between Putney and Rotherhithe, both inclusive, in the County of Surrey. (Repealed by Egham and Rotherhithe Coal Trade Act 1806 (46 Geo. 3. c. xxxii))
Liverpool Rectory Act 1786	26 Geo. 3. c. 15	22 March 1786
An Act for augmenting and ascertaining the Income of the Rectors of the Parish Church and Parochial Chapel of Liverpool.
East India Company (No. 1) Act 1786 (repealed)	26 Geo. 3. c. 16	11 April 1786
An Act to explain and amend certain Provisions of an Act, made in the Twenty-fourth Year of the Reign of His present Majesty, (Note: East India Company Act 1784 (24 Geo. 3. Sess. 2. c. 25)) respecting the better Regulation and Management of the Affairs of the East India Company. (Repealed by East India Company Act 1793 (33 Geo. 3. c. 52))
Tewkesbury (Improvement) Act 1786	26 Geo. 3. c. 17	22 March 1786
An Act for paving, repairing, cleansing, lighting, and watching, the Streets, Lanes, Ways, Passages, and Places, within the Town of Tewkesbury and the Precincts thereof, in the County of Gloucester, for the Removal of present, and Prevention of future Encroachments, Nuisances, and Annoyances therein, for regulating Carts and other Carriages, and ascertaining the Rates of Carriage, and for widening some Part of the Street called Church Street within the said Town.
Kent (Small Debts) Act 1786 (repealed)	26 Geo. 3. c. 18	11 April 1786
An Act for the more easy and speedy Recovery of small Debts, within the Town and Borough of Deal, and the Parishes of Ripple, Sutton, Northbourne, Great Mongeham, Little Mongeham, Tilmanstone, Betshanger, Ham, and Sholden, in the County of Kent. (Repealed by County Courts Act 1846 (9 & 10 Vict. c. 95))
Plymouth (Poor Relief) Act 1786 (repealed)	26 Geo. 3. c. 19	11 April 1786
An Act to amend and render more effectual Two Acts made in the Sixth Year of the Reign of Queen Anne, (Note: Plymouth Workhouse Act 1707 (6 Ann. c. 46)) and the Thirty-second Year of the Reign of His late Majesty King George the Second, (Note: Plymouth (Poor Relief) Act 1758 (32 Geo. 2. c. 39)) for erecting a Workhouse in the Town and Borough of Plymouth, in the County of Devon, and for setting the Poor on Work, and maintaining them there; and for obliging the Mayor and Commonalty of Plymouth, to contribute towards the County Rates of Devon; and for applying for the Relief of the Poor in the said Workhouse, certain Surplus Monies, which have formerly arisen by the Assessment for raising the Land Tax in the said Town; and for granting further Power to the Guardians of the Poor of the Town of Plymouth, in the County of Devon. (Repealed by Statute Law (Repeals) Act 2008 (c. 12))
Oxford Canal Act 1786 (repealed)	26 Geo. 3. c. 20	11 April 1786
An Act to amend and render effectual Two Acts of the Ninth (Note: Oxford Canal Act 1769 (9 Geo. 3. c. 70)) and Fifteenth (Note: Oxford Canal Act 1775 (15 Geo. 3. c. 9)) Years of His present Majesty, for making and maintaining a Navigable Canal from the Coventry Canal Navigation to the City of Oxford. (Repealed by Oxford Canal Act 1808 (48 Geo. 3. c. iii) and Oxford Canal Navigation Act 1829 (10 Geo. 4. c. xlviii))
Dumbarton Roads and Bridges Act 1786 (repealed)	26 Geo. 3. c. 21	3 May 1786
An Act for repairing the Highways and Bridges in the County of Dumbarton. (Repealed by Roads and Bridges (Scotland) Act 1878 (41 & 42 Vict. c. 51) and Local Government (Scotland) Act 1889 (52 & 53 Vict. c. 50))
Kent (Small Debts) (No. 2) Act 1786 (repealed)	26 Geo. 3. c. 22	3 May 1786
An Act for the more easy and speedy Recovery of small Debts within the Town and Port of Sandwich and Vill of Ramsgate, and the Parishes of Minster and Saint Lawrence in the Isle of Thanet, Walmer, Ash next Sandwich, Eastry, Wingham, Staple, Goodnestone next Wingham, Chillenden, Nonnington, Woodnesborough, otherwise Winsborow, Eythorne, Word otherwise Worth, Elmestone, Preston next Wingham, Ickham, and Wickhambreux, in the County of Kent. (Repealed by Sandwich and Ramsgate Court of Requests Act 1807 (47 Geo. 3 Sess. 1. c. xxxv) and County Courts Act 1846 (9 & 10 Vict. c. 95))
Westbury, Wiltshire (Additional Overseer) Act 1786 (repealed)	26 Geo. 3. c. 23	3 May 1786
An Act for the Appointment of an additional Overseer, for the better Government of the Poor of the Parish of Westbury in the County of Wilts. (Repealed by Statute Law Revision Act 1948 (11 & 12 Geo. 6. c. 62))
Shrewsbury Gaol Act 1786 (repealed)	26 Geo. 3. c. 24	3 May 1786
An Act for building a new Gaol and House of Correction for the County of Salop, and the several Boroughs, Towns Corporate, Liberties, Franchises, and Places within the same; and for explaining and amending an Act made in the Twenty-third Year of His present Majesty, intituled, "An Act for building a new Shire-hall and Guildhall for the County of Salop and the Town of Shrewsbury in the said County, and for the other Purposes therein mentioned." (Note: Shrewsbury Guildhall Act 1783 (23 Geo. 3. c. 20)) (Repealed by Salop County Council (Shirehall and Guildhall) Act 1915 (5 & 6 Geo. 5. c. xviii))
Fort William in Bengal Act 1786 (repealed)	26 Geo. 3. c. 25	3 May 1786
An Act for obviating all Doubts which have arisen or might arise, with Respect to the exclusive Power of the Court of Directors of the East India Company, to nominate and appoint the Governor General, and Council of the Presidency of Fort William in Bengal. (Repealed by Statute Law Revision Act 1861 (24 & 25 Vict. c. 101))
Newfoundland Fisheries Act 1786 (repealed)	26 Geo. 3. c. 26	22 May 1786
An Act to amend and render more effectual the several Laws now in Force, for encouraging the Fisheries carried on at Newfoundland and Parts adjacent, from Great Britain, Ireland, and the British Dominions in Europe, and for granting Bounties for a limited Time on certain Terms and Conditions. (Repealed by Statute Law Revision Act 1871 (34 & 35 Vict. c. 116))
Forfeited Estates (Scotland) Act 1786 (repealed)	26 Geo. 3. c. 27	22 May 1786
An Act for authorizing the Lord Chief Baron and remanent Barons of the Court of Exchequer in Scotland, out of the unappropriated Money arising from the forfeited and lately annexed Estates in Scotland, to pay a certain Sum to the Society in Scotland for propagating Christian Knowledge, for the Purposes and under the Conditions therein mentioned. (Repealed by Statute Law (Repeals) Act 1978 (c. 45))
Romford Poor Relief Act 1786 (repealed)	26 Geo. 3. c. 28	22 May 1786
An Act for providing a proper Workhouse, and better regulating the Poor within the Parish of Romford in the Liberty of Havering Atte Bower in the County of Essex. (Repealed by Statute Law (Repeals) Act 2013 (c. 2))
Margate Theatre Act 1786 (repealed)	26 Geo. 3. c. 29	22 May 1786
An Act to enable His Majesty to licence a Playhouse within the Town and Port of Margate, in the Isle of Thanet, in the County of Kent, under certain Restrictions therein limited. (Repealed by Statute Law Revision Act 1948 (11 & 12 Geo. 6. c. 62))
Coventry Canal Act 1786	26 Geo. 3. c. 30	22 May 1786
An Act to enable the Company of Proprietors of the Coventry Canal Navigation, to complete the said Canal to Fradley Heath in the County of Stafford, and for other Purposes therein mentioned.
National Debt Reduction Act 1786	26 Geo. 3. c. 31	26 May 1786
An Act for vesting certain Sums in Commissioners at the End of every Quarter of a Year, to be by them applied to the Reduction of the National Debt.
Loans or Exchequer Bills Act 1786 (repealed)	26 Geo. 3. c. 32	26 May 1786
An Act for raising a certain Sum of Money by Loans or Exchequer Bills, for the Service of the Year One thousand seven hundred and eighty-six. (Repealed by Statute Law Revision Act 1871 (34 & 35 Vict. c. 116))
Loans or Exchequer Bills (No. 2) Act 1786 (repealed)	26 Geo. 3. c. 33	26 May 1786
An Act for raising a further Sum of Money by Loans or Exchequer Bills, for the Service of the Year One thousand seven hundred and eighty-six. (Repealed by Statute Law Revision Act 1871 (34 & 35 Vict. c. 116))
National Debt Act 1786 (repealed)	26 Geo. 3. c. 34	26 May 1786
An Act for altering the Days of Payment of the long Annuities, and Annuities for Thirty and Twenty-nine Years. (Repealed by Statute Law Revision Act 1870 (33 & 34 Vict. c. 69))
Bounties for Destroying Spanish Ships Act 1786 (repealed)	26 Geo. 3. c. 35	26 May 1786
An Act to explain, amend, and render more effectual an Act made in the last Session of Parliament, (Note: Bounties for Destroying Spanish Ships Act 1785 (25 Geo. 3. c. 29)) intituled, "An Act to explain, amend and render more effectual an Act passed in the Twenty-third Year of His present Majesty's Reign, (Note: Bounty to Garrison of Gibraltar Act 1783 (23 Geo. 3. c. 16)) intituled, 'An Act for authorizing the Treasurer of the Navy to pay to the Garrison and Naval Department at Gibraltar the like Bounty for destroying certain Spanish Ships of War, as is allowed to the Officers and Men on Board any of His Majesty's Ships of War taking or destroying Ships of War belonging to the Enemy.'" (Repealed by Statute Law Revision Act 1871 (34 & 35 Vict. c. 116))
Salt Duties, etc. Act 1786 (repealed)	26 Geo. 3. c. 36	26 May 1786
An Act to explain an Act made in the last Session of Parliament, (Note: Salt Duties Act 1785 (25 Geo. 3. c. 63)) with respect to the Allowances to be made for Waste on the Exportation of White Salt and Rock Salt to the Isle of Man; for limiting the Quantity of British refined Sugar to be exported to the Isle of Man; and for repealing so much of an Act made in the Seventh Year of the Reign of His present Majesty, (Note: Customs (No. 4) Act 1766 (7 Geo. 3. c. 45)) intituled, "An Act for encouraging and regulating the Trade and Manufacture of the Isle of Man; and for the more easy Supply of the Inhabitants there with a certain Quantity of Wheat, Barley, Oats, Meal, and Flour authorised by an Act made in this Session (Note: Importation and Exportation (No. 6) Act 1766 (7 Geo. 3. c. 3)) to be transported to the said Island, as relates to permitting any Person to import into the Isle of Man Fish from any Place whatever except from Great Britain, without Payment of any Custom or other Duty whatsoever. (Repealed by Statute Law Revision Act 1861 (24 & 25 Vict. c. 101))
Blackfriars Bridge (Sunday Tolls) Act 1786 (repealed)	26 Geo. 3. c. 37	26 May 1786
An Act for laying a Toll upon all Horses and Carriages passing on a Sunday over Blackfriars Bridge, and for applying the Money to arise thereby towards encreasing the Fund for watching, lighting, cleansing, watering, and repairing the said Bridge. (Repealed by Statute Law Revision Act 1948 (11 & 12 Geo. 6. c. 62))
Imprisonment of Debtors, etc. Act 1786 (repealed)	26 Geo. 3. c. 38	26 May 1786
An Act for regulating the Time of the Imprisonment of Debtors imprisoned by Process from Courts instituted for the Recovery of small Debts; for abolishing the Claim of Fees of Gaolers and others in the Cases of such Imprisonment; and for ascertaining the Qualifications of the Commissioners. (Repealed by Statute Law Revision Act 1871 (34 & 35 Vict. c. 116))
Newcastle (Streets) Act 1786 (repealed)	26 Geo. 3. c. 39	22 May 1786
An Act for widening, enlarging, and cleansing the Streets, Lanes, and other Public Places, and for opening new Streets, Markets, and Passages within the Town of Newcastle-upon-Tyne and the Liberties thereof; and for removing and preventing Annoyances therein; and for regulating the Public Markets, and Common Stage Waggons, Drays, and Carts carrying Goods for Hire. (Repealed by Newcastle-upon-Tyne Improvement Act 1837 (7 Will. 4 & 1 Vict. c. lxxii))
Exports Act 1786 (repealed)	26 Geo. 3. c. 40	13 June 1786
An Act for regulating the Production of Manifests; and for more effectually preventing fraudulent Practices in obtaining Bounties and Drawbacks, and in the clandestine re-landing of Goods. (Repealed by Finance Act 1918 (8 & 9 Geo. 5. c. 155))
Fisheries Act 1786 (repealed)	26 Geo. 3. c. 41	13 June 1786
An Act for the further Support and Encouragement of the Fisheries carried on in the Greenland Seas and Davis's Streights. (Repealed by Statute Law Revision Act 1861 (24 & 25 Vict. c. 101))
Customs Act 1786 (repealed)	26 Geo. 3. c. 42	13 June 1786
An Act for granting to His Majesty an additional Duty upon Battens and Deals imported into Great Britain. (Repealed by Statute Law Revision Act 1861 (24 & 25 Vict. c. 101))
Hemp and Flax Act 1786 (repealed)	26 Geo. 3. c. 43	13 June 1786
An Act to continue and render more effectual an Act passed in the Twenty-first Year of His Majesty's Reign, (Note: Growth of Hemp and Flax Act 1781 (21 Geo. 3. c. 58)) for the Encouragement of the Growth of Hemp and Flax in that Part of Great Britain called England. (Repealed by Statute Law Revision Act 1861 (24 & 25 Vict. c. 101))
Relief and Debtors Act 1786 (repealed)	26 Geo. 3. c. 44	13 June 1786
An Act for the further Relief of Debtors with respect to the Imprisonment of their Persons, and to oblige Debtors who shall continue in Execution in Prison beyond a certain Time, and for Sums not exceeding what are mentioned in the Act, to make Discovery of, and deliver upon Oath their Estates for their Creditors' Benefit. (Repealed by Statute Law Revision Act 1871 (34 & 35 Vict. c. 116))
Pilchard Fishery Act 1786 (repealed)	26 Geo. 3. c. 45	16 June 1786
An Act to continue and amend an Act made in the Twenty-fifth Year of the Reign of His present Majesty, (Note: Pilchard Fishery Act 1785 (25 Geo. 3. c. 58)) for the Encouragement of the Pilchard Fishery, by allowing a farther Bounty upon Pilchards taken, cured, and exported. (Repealed by Sea Fisheries Act 1868 (31 & 32 Vict. c. 45))
Salaries of Judges (Scotland) Act 1786 (repealed)	26 Geo. 3. c. 46	16 June 1786
An Act for augmenting and fixing the Salaries of the Lords of Session, Lords Commissioners of Justiciary and Barons of Exchequer in that Part of Great Britain called Scotland. (Repealed by Statute Law Revision Act 1861 (24 & 25 Vict. c. 101))
Admiralty, etc., Courts (Scotland) Act 1786 (repealed)	26 Geo. 3. c. 47	16 June 1786
An Act for discharging the Payment of Sentence Money and other Fees of Court, to the Judge of the Court of Admiralty in that Part of Great Britain called Scotland, and the Payment of Sentence Money to the Judges of the Commissary Court in Edinburgh; for granting Salaries to the Judges of the said Courts in Lieu thereof; and for regulating the Nomination of the said Judges. (Repealed by Statute Law Revision Act 1871 (34 & 35 Vict. c. 116))
Stamps Act 1786 (repealed)	26 Geo. 3. c. 48	16 June 1786
An Act for granting to His Majesty certain Duties on Stamped Vellum, Parchment, and Paper within that Part of Great Britain called Scotland, to replace to the Revenue the Sums granted out of the same in this Session of Parliament towards the Augmentation of the Salaries of the Judges of the Courts of Session, Justiciary, Exchequer, and Admiralty Court in Scotland, and Commissary Court of Edinburgh. (Repealed by Inland Revenue Repeal Act 1870 (33 & 34 Vict. c. 99))
Stamps (No. 2) Act 1786 (repealed)	26 Geo. 3. c. 49	16 June 1786
An Act for granting to His Majesty certain Stamp Duties on Perfumery, Hair Powder, and other Articles therein mentioned, and on Licences to be taken out by Persons uttering or vending the same. (Repealed by Statute Law Revision Act 1861 (24 & 25 Vict. c. 101))
Southern Whale Fishery Act 1786 (repealed)	26 Geo. 3. c. 50	16 June 1786
An Act for the Encouragement of the Southern Whale Fishery. (Repealed by Southern Whale Fisheries Act 1795 (35 Geo. 3. c. 92))
Duties on Starch Act 1786 (repealed)	26 Geo. 3. c. 51	16 June 1786
An Act for better securing the Duties on Starch, and for preventing Frauds on the said Duties. (Repealed by Statute Law Revision Act 1861 (24 & 25 Vict. c. 101))
Tobacco Duties Act 1786 (repealed)	26 Geo. 3. c. 52	16 June 1786
An Act for the more effectually, preventing the fraudulent Removal of Tobacco, and for the Ease of the fair Trader for discontinuing the Discount upon Payment on Bonds before Due, and establishing the Duty to be paid upon Tobacco of the Growth of the British Plantations and the United States of America. (Repealed by Statute Law Revision Act 1871 (34 & 35 Vict. c. 116))
Continuance of Laws Act 1786 (repealed)	26 Geo. 3. c. 53	16 June 1786
An Act to continue several Laws relating to the giving further Encouragement to the Importation of Naval Stores from the British Colonies in America; to the Allowance upon the Exportation of British made Gunpowder; to the further encouraging the Manufacture of British Sail Cloth, and to the Duties payable on Foreign Sail Cloth; to the granting Liberty to carry Sugars of the Growth, Produce, or Manufacture of any of His Majesty's Sugar Colonies, directly to Foreign Parts, in Ships built in Great Britain, and navigated according to Law; to the importing Salt from Europe into the Province of Quebec in America, to the discontinuing the Duties payable upon the Importation of Tallow, Hog's Lard, and Grease; to the permitting the free Importation of Raw Goat Skins into this Kingdom; to the repealing the Duties upon Pot and Pearl Ashes, Wood and Weed Ashes imported into Great Britain, and for granting other Duties in Lieu thereof; to the registering the Prices at which Corn is sold in the several Counties of Great Britain, and the Quantity exported and imported; and to the effectually encouraging the Manufactures of Flax and Cotton in Great Britain; and to revive and continue several Laws relating to the allowing a Drawback of the Duties on Rum, shipped as Stores to be consumed on board Merchant Ships on their Voyages; and to the granting a Bounty upon the Importation of Hemp, and rough and undressed Flax from His Majesty's Colonies in America. (Repealed by Statute Law Revision Act 1871 (34 & 35 Vict. c. 116))
Land Tax (No. 2) Act 1786 (repealed)	26 Geo. 3. c. 54	16 June 1786
An Act for continuing the Salaries and Profits of the Commissioners, Clerks, and other Officers of the Stamp Office, rateable to the Land Tax in Shire Lane Ward, within the Division of Saint Clement Danes and Saint Mary-le-Strand, in the Liberty of Westminster, notwithstanding the said Office should be removed into any other Division or Place. (Repealed by Statute Law Revision Act 1871 (34 & 35 Vict. c. 116))
Middlesex Gaol Act 1786 (repealed)	26 Geo. 3. c. 55	16 June 1786
An Act to enable the Justices of the Peace for the County of Middlesex to raise Money in manner therein mentioned, for erecting a House of Correction within the said County. (Repealed by Statute Law (Repeals) Act 2008 (c. 12))
Returns Relative to the Poor Act 1786 (repealed)	26 Geo. 3. c. 56	27 June 1786
An Act for obliging Overseers of the Poor to make Returns upon Oath to certain Questions specified therein relative to the State of the Poor. (Repealed by Statute Law Revision Act 1871 (34 & 35 Vict. c. 116))
East India Company Act 1786 (repealed)	26 Geo. 3. c. 57	27 June 1786
An Act for the further Regulation of the Trial of Persons accused of certain Offences committed in the East Indies, for repealing so much of an Act made in the Twenty-fourth Year of the Reign of His present Majesty, intituled, "An Act for the better Regulation and Management of the Affairs of the East India Company, and of the British Possessions in India; and for establishing a Court of Judicature for the more speedy and effectual Trial of Persons accused of Offences committed in the East Indies," as requires the Servants of the East Indies Company to deliver Inventories of their Estates and Effects; for rendering the Laws more effectual against Persons unlawfully resorting to the East Indies; and for the more easy Proof in certain Cases of Deeds and Writings executed in Great Britain or India. (Repealed by Government of India (Amendment) Act 1916 (6 & 7 Geo. 5. c. 37))
Returns of Charitable Donations Act 1786 or Gilbert's Act (repealed)	26 Geo. 3. c. 58	27 June 1786
An Act for procuring upon Oath Returns of all Charitable Donations for the Benefit of Poor Persons in the several Parishes and Places within that Part of Great Britain called England. (Repealed by Statute Law Revision Act 1871 (34 & 35 Vict. c. 116))
Excise Act 1786 (repealed)	26 Geo. 3. c. 59	27 June 1786
An Act for repealing certain Duties now payable on Wines imported, and for granting new Duties in Lieu thereof, to be collected under the Management of the Commissioners of Excise. (Repealed by Statute Law Revision Act 1871 (34 & 35 Vict. c. 116))
Shipping Act 1786 (repealed)	26 Geo. 3. c. 60	27 June 1786
An Act for the further Increase and Encouragement of Shipping and Navigation. (Repealed by Registering of Vessels Act 1823 (4 Geo. 4. c. 41))
Appropriation Act 1786 (repealed)	26 Geo. 3. c. 61	4 July 1786
An Act for granting to His Majesty a certain Sum of Money out of the Sinking Fund, and for applying certain Monies therein mentioned for the Service of the Year One thousand seven hundred and eighty-six, and for further appropriating the Supplies granted in this Session of Parliament. (Repealed by Statute Law Revision Act 1871 (34 & 35 Vict. c. 116))
East India Company (Money) Act 1786 or the East India Company Stock Act 1786 (repealed)	26 Geo. 3. c. 62	5 July 1786
An Act to enable the East India Company to raise Money by a Sale of Annuities and by encreasing their Capital Stock. (Repealed by East India Loans Act 1937 (1 Edw. 8 & 1 Geo. 6. c. 14))
Navy Act 1786 (repealed)	26 Geo. 3. c. 63	5 July 1786
An Act for the further preventing Frauds and Abuses attending the Payment of Wages, Prize Money, and other Allowances due for the Service of Petty Officers and Seamen on Board any of His Majesty's Ships. (Repealed by Wills, etc., of Seamen, etc. Act 1815 (55 Geo. 3. c. 60))
Excise (No. 2) Act 1786 (repealed)	26 Geo. 3. c. 64	5 July 1786
An Act to discontinue for a limited Time the several Duties payable in Scotland upon Low Wines and Spirits, and upon Worts, Wash, and other Liquors there used in the Distillation of Spirits; and for granting to His Majesty other Duties in Lieu thereof. (Repealed by Statute Law Revision Act 1871 (34 & 35 Vict. c. 116))
Lottery Act 1786 (repealed)	26 Geo. 3. c. 65	4 July 1786
An Act for granting to His Majesty a certain Sum of Money to be raised by a Lottery. (Repealed by Statute Law Revision Act 1871 (34 & 35 Vict. c. 116))
Inquiry into Fees (Public Offices) Act 1786 (repealed)	26 Geo. 3. c. 66	4 July 1786
An Act for appointing Commissioners further to enquire into the Fees, Gratuities, Perquisites, and Emoluments, which are or have been lately received in the several Public Offices therein mentioned, to examine into any Abuses which may exist in the same, and to report such Observations as shall occur to them for the better conducting and managing the Business transacted in the said Offices. (Repealed by Statute Law Revision Act 1871 (34 & 35 Vict. c. 116))
Audit of Public Accounts Act 1786 (repealed)	26 Geo. 3. c. 67	5 July 1786
An Act for appointing and enabling Commissioners further to examine, take and state the Public Accounts of the Kingdom. (Repealed by Statute Law Revision Act 1871 (34 & 35 Vict. c. 116))
American Loyalists Act 1786 (repealed)	26 Geo. 3. c. 68	4 July 1786
An Act for appointing Commissioners further to enquire into the Losses and Services of all such Persons who have suffered in their Rights, Properties, and Professions, during the late unhappy Dissentions in America, in Consequence of their Loyalty to His Majesty and Attachment to the British Government. (Repealed by Statute Law Revision Act 1871 (34 & 35 Vict. c. 116))
Militia Pay Act 1786 (repealed)	26 Geo. 3. c. 69	5 July 1786
An Act for defraying the Charge of the Militia in that Part of Great Britain called England for One Year, beginning the Twenty-fifth Day of March One thousand seven hundred and eighty-six. (Repealed by Statute Law Revision Act 1871 (34 & 35 Vict. c. 116))
Rectifying a Mistake in Chapter 61 Act 1786 (repealed)	26 Geo. 3. c. 70	11 July 1786
An Act to rectify a Mistake in an Act made in this present Session of Parliament, intituled, "An Act for granting to His Majesty a certain Sum of Money out of the Sinking Fund, and for applying certain Monies therein mentioned for the Service of the Year One thousand seven hundred and eighty-six; and for further appropriating the Supplies granted in this Session of Parliament." (Note: Appropriation Act 1786 (26 Geo. 3. c. 61)) (Repealed by Statute Law Revision Act 1871 (34 & 35 Vict. c. 116))
Knackers Act 1786 (repealed)	26 Geo. 3. c. 71	11 July 1786
An Act for regulating Houses and other Places kept for the Purpose of slaughtering Horses. (Repealed by Public Health (London) Act 1891 (54 & 55 Vict. c. 76) and Food and Drugs Act 1938 (1 & 2 Geo. 6. c. 56))
Hackney Coaches Act 1786 (repealed)	26 Geo. 3. c. 72	4 July 1786
An Act for explaining and amending an Act made in the Twenty-fourth Year of the Reign of His present Majesty, intituled, "An Act for laying an additional Duty on Hackney Coaches, and for explaining and amending several Acts of Parliament relating to Hackney Coaches." (Note: Hackney Coaches Act 1784 (24 Geo. 3. Sess. 2. c. 27)) (Repealed by London Hackney Carriage Act 1831 (1 & 2 Will. 4. c. 22))
Excise (No. 3) Act 1786 (repealed)	26 Geo. 3. c. 73	11 July 1786
An Act to discontinue for a limited Time the Payment of the Duties upon Low Wines and Spirits for Home Consumption, and for granting and securing the due Payment of other Duties in Lieu thereof, and for the better Regulation of the making and vending British Spirits, and for discontinuing for a limited Time certain Imports and Duties upon Rum and Spirits imported from the West Indies. (Repealed by Statute Law Revision Act 1871 (34 & 35 Vict. c. 116))
Excise (No. 4) Act 1786 (repealed)	26 Geo. 3. c. 74	10 July 1786
An Act for granting to his Majesty additional Duties upon Sweets; and for ascertaining the Duties upon Licences to be taken out by Persons dealing in Sweets. (Repealed by Statute Law Revision Act 1871 (34 & 35 Vict. c. 116))
Losses from Cession of East Florida Act 1786 (repealed)	26 Geo. 3. c. 75	10 July 1786
An Act for appointing Commissioners to enquire into the Losses of all such Persons who have suffered in their Properties in consequence of the Cession of the Province of East Florida to the King of Spain. (Repealed by Statute Law Revision Act 1871 (34 & 35 Vict. c. 116))
Exportation (No. 3) Act 1786 (repealed)	26 Geo. 3. c. 76	5 July 1786
An Act for repealing so much of Two Acts passed in the Fourteenth (Note: Exportation (No. 5) Act 1774 (14 Geo. 3. c. 71)) and Twenty-first (Note: Exportation Act 1781 (21 Geo. 3. c. 37)) Years of the Reign of His present Majesty, as prohibits the Exportation of Wool Cards of a limited Price. (Repealed by Statute Law Revision Act 1871 (34 & 35 Vict. c. 116))
Excise (No. 5) Act 1786 (repealed)	26 Geo. 3. c. 77	11 July 1786
An Act to limit a Time for the Re-payment of the Duties on Male Servants and Carriages by the Commissioners of Excise, and also on Horses, Waggons, Wains, and Carts, by the Commissioners of Stamps, and for the Amendment of several Laws relating to the Duties under the Management of the Commissioners of Excise. (Repealed by Inland Revenue Regulation Act 1890 (53 & 54 Vict. c. 21))
Paper Duties Act 1786 (repealed)	26 Geo. 3. c. 78	10 July 1786
An Act for better securing the Duties on Paper printed, painted, or stained in Great Britain. (Repealed by Statute Law Revision Act 1871 (34 & 35 Vict. c. 116))
Duties on Houses, etc. Act 1786 (repealed)	26 Geo. 3. c. 79	10 July 1786
An Act to explain, amend, and render more effectual an Act made in the last Session of Parliament, intituled, "An Act for transferring the Receipt and Management of certain Duties therein mentioned from the Commissioners of Excise and the Commissioners of Stamps, respectively, to the Commissioners for the Affairs of Taxes; and also for making further Provisions in respect to the said Duties so transferred;" (Note: Excise (No. 2) Act 1785 (25 Geo. 3. c. 47)) and for making certain Provisions respecting Oaths to be administered by the Commissioners for the Duties on Houses and Windows or Lights, or any other Duties put under their Management. (Repealed by House Tax Act 1803 (43 Geo. 3. c. 161))
Continuance of Laws (No. 2) Act 1786 (repealed)	26 Geo. 3. c. 80	5 July 1786
An Act for further continuing certain Acts therein mentioned, relating to the further Punishment of Persons going armed or disguised in Defiance of the Laws of Customs or Excise, and to the preventing the committing of Frauds by Bankrupts. (Repealed by Statute Law Revision Act 1871 (34 & 35 Vict. c. 116))
Fisheries (No. 2) Act 1786 (repealed)	26 Geo. 3. c. 81	10 July 1786
An Act for the more effectual Encouragement of the British Fisheries. (Repealed by Statute Law Revision Act 1872 (35 & 36 Vict. c. 63))
Stamps (No. 3) Act 1786 (repealed)	26 Geo. 3. c. 82	4 July 1786
An Act for the more effectually carrying into Execution the Laws relating to the Duties on Stamped Vellum, Parchment, and Paper, and for repealing certain Stamp Duties on Policies for insuring Property in any foreign Kingdom or State from Loss by Fire. (Repealed by Inland Revenue Repeal Act 1870 (33 & 34 Vict. c. 99))
Coal Trade (London) Act 1786 (repealed)	26 Geo. 3. c. 83	27 June 1786
An Act to explain and amend an Act passed in the Seventh Year of the Reign of His present Majesty, (Note: Coal Metage, etc., London Act 1766 (7 Geo. 3. c. 23)) to prevent Frauds and Abuses in the Admeasurement of Coals sold by Wharf Measure within the City of London and the Liberties thereof, and between Tower Dock and Limehouse Hole in the County of Middlesex. (Repealed by Statute Law (Repeals) Act 1976 (c. 16))
Consecration of Bishops Abroad Act 1786 (repealed)	26 Geo. 3. c. 84	4 July 1786
An Act to empower the Archbishop of Canterbury or the Archbishop of York, for the time being, to consecrate to the Office of a Bishop, Persons being Subjects or Citizens of Countries out of His Majesty's Dominions. (Repealed by Statute Law Revision Act 1871 (34 & 35 Vict. c. 116) (Note: Incorrectly cited as "SLR 1875" in the Chronological Table of the Statutes.))
Bounty on Cordage Exported Act 1786 (repealed)	26 Geo. 3. c. 85	5 July 1786
An Act to revive, continue, and amend so much of an Act made in the Sixth Year of the Reign of His present Majesty, intituled, "An Act for allowing a Bounty on the Exportation of British made Cordage, and for discontinuing the Drawbacks upon Foreign Rough Hemp exported," (Note: Bounty of Exportation Act 1766 (6 Geo. 3. c. 45)) as relates to allowing a Bounty on the Exportation of British made Cordage. (Repealed by Statute Law Revision Act 1871 (34 & 35 Vict. c. 116))
Merchant Shipping Act 1786 (repealed)	26 Geo. 3. c. 86	11 July 1786
An Act to explain and amend an Act made in the Seventh Year of His late Majesty's Reign, intituled, "An Act to settle how far Owners of Ships shall be answerable for the Acts of the Masters or Mariners," (Note: Responsibility of Shipowners Act 1733 (7 Geo. 2. c. 15)) and for giving a further Relief to the Owners of Ships. (Repealed by Merchant Shipping Repeal Act 1854 (17 & 18 Vict. c. 120))
Crown Land Revenues, etc. Act 1786 (repealed)	26 Geo. 3. c. 87	11 July 1786
An Act for appointing Commissioners to enquire into the State and Condition of the Woods, Forests, and Land Revenues belonging to the Crown, and to sell or alienate Fee-farm and other un-improvable Rents. (Repealed by Statute Law Revision Act 1871 (34 & 35 Vict. c. 116))
Annuity to Lady Maria Carlton Act 1786 (repealed)	26 Geo. 3. c. 88	11 July 1786
An Act for settling and securing a certain Annuity for the Use of Lady Maria Carlton, Wife of Sir Guy Carlton, Knight of the Most Honourable Order of the Bath, and Guy Carlton and Thomas Carlton Sons of the said Sir Guy Carlton, in Consideration of the eminent Services performed by him to His Majesty and this County. (Repealed by Statute Law Revision Act 1871 (34 & 35 Vict. c. 116))
Exportation (No. 4) Act 1786 (repealed)	26 Geo. 3. c. 89	11 July 1786
An Act to explain, amend, and extend to other Tools and Utensils, an Act made in the Twenty-fifth Year of the Reign of His present Majesty, intituled, "An Act to prohibit the Exportation to foreign Parts of Tools and Utensils made use of in the Iron and Steel Manufactures of this Kingdom; and to prevent the seducing of Artificers or Workmen employed in those Manufactures to go into Parts beyond the Seas." (Note: Exportation Act (No. 2) 1785 (25 Geo. 3. c. 67)) (Repealed by Customs Law Repeal Act 1825 (6 Geo. 4. c. 105))
Salt Duties Act 1786 (repealed)	26 Geo. 3. c. 90	10 July 1786
An Act for repealing so much of an Act passed in the Twenty-second Year of His present Majesty's Reign, intituled, "An Act for granting to His Majesty additional Duties upon Salt; and certain Duties upon Glauber or Epsom Salts; and also on Mineral Alkali or Flux for Glass made from Salt; and to prevent Frauds in the Duties on foul Salt to be used in manuring of Lands;" as relates to the obtaining Rock Salt or Salt Rock, or Brine, or Sea Water for the Purpose of making Mineral Alkali or Flux for Glass, Duty free. (Repealed by Statute Law Revision Act 1861 (24 & 25 Vict. c. 101))
Madhouses Act 1786 or the Madhouse Law Perpetuation Act 1786 (repealed)	26 Geo. 3. c. 91	4 July 1786
An Act for making perpetual an Act made in the Fourteenth Year of the Reign of His present Majesty, intituled, "An Act for regulating Madhouses." (Note: Madhouses Act 1774 (14 Geo. 3. c. 49)) (Repealed by Statute Law Revision Act 1861 (24 & 25 Vict. c. 101))
Unlawful Pawning Act 1786 (repealed)	26 Geo. 3. c. 92	4 July 1786
An Act to continue, for a limited Time, an Act made in the Twenty-fourth Year of the Reign of His present Majesty King George the Third, (Note: Pawnbrokers Act 1784 (24 Geo. 3. Sess. 2. c. 42)) to explain, amend, and render more effectual, an Act made in the Thirtieth Year of the Reign of His late Majesty King George the Second, intituled, "An Act for the more effectual Punishment of Persons who shall attain or attempt to attain Possession of Goods or Money by false or untrue Pretences; for preventing the unlawful Pawning of Goods; for the easy Redemption of Goods pawned; and for preventing Gaming in Public Houses by Journeymen, Labourers, Servants, and Apprentices;" (Note: Obtaining Money by False Pretences, etc. Act 1757 (30 Geo. 2. c. 24)) so far as the same relates to the preventing the unlawful Pawning of Goods, and for the easy Redemption of Goods pawned. (Repealed by Statute Law Revision Act 1871 (34 & 35 Vict. c. 116))
Annuity to Brook Watson, Esquire Act 1786 (repealed)	26 Geo. 3. c. 93	11 July 1786
An Act to enable His Majesty to grant a certain Annuity to Brook Watson Esquire, late Commissary General in North America, in Consideration of his diligent and meritorious Services in that Office. (Repealed by Statute Law Revision Act 1871 (34 & 35 Vict. c. 116))
Faversham, Portsmouth, Plymouth Fortifications Act 1786	26 Geo. 3. c. 94	4 July 1786
An Act for making Compensation to the Proprietors of such Lands and Hereditaments as have been purchased for the more safe and convenient carrying on His Majesty's Gunpowder Works and Mills near the Town of Faversham, and for the better securing His Majesty's Docks, Ships, and Stores, at Portsmouth and Plymouth, in pursuance of Acts of Parliament made in the Twenty-third (Note: Portsmouth, Chatham Fortifications Act 1783 (23 Geo. 3. c. 71)) and Twenty-fourth (Note: Portsmouth, Plymouth Fortifications Act 1784 (24 Geo. 3. Sess. 2. c. 29)) Years of His present Majesty's Reign, and for other Purposes therein mentioned.
First Meetings of Certain Commissioners Act 1786 (repealed)	26 Geo. 3. c. 95	10 July 1786
An Act for enlarging the Times appointed for the first Meetings of Commissioners and other Persons for putting in Execution certain Acts of this Session of Parliament. (Repealed by Statute Law Revision Act 1871 (34 & 35 Vict. c. 116))
Proceedings Against Warren Hastings Act 1786 (repealed)	26 Geo. 3. c. 96	5 July 1786
An Act to provide that the Proceedings now depending in the House of Commons upon Articles of Charge of High Crimes and Misdemeanors which have been exhibited against Warren Hastings Esquire, late Governor General of Fort William in Bengal, shall not be discontinued by any Prorogation or Dissolution of Parliament. (Repealed by Statute Law Revision Act 1871 (34 & 35 Vict. c. 116))
Exchequer Bills Act 1786 (repealed)	26 Geo. 3. c. 97	4 July 1786
An Act for raising a further Sum of Money by Exchequer Bills, for the Service of the Year One thousand seven hundred and eighty-six. (Repealed by Statute Law Revision Act 1871 (34 & 35 Vict. c. 116))
Indemnity Act 1786 (repealed)	26 Geo. 3. c. 98	5 July 1786
An Act to indemnify such Persons as have omitted to qualify themselves for Offices and Employments, and to indemnify Justices of the Peace or others who have omitted to register or deliver in their Qualifications within the Time limited by Law, and for giving further Time for those Purposes; and to indemnify Members and Officers in Cities, Corporations, and Borough Towns, whose Admissions have been omitted to be stamped according to Law, or having been stamped have been lost or mislaid, and for allowing them Time to provide Admissions duly stamped; to give further Time to such Persons as have omitted to make and file Affidavits of the Execution of Indentures of Clerks to Attornies and Solicitors. (Repealed by Promissory Oaths Act 1871 (34 & 35 Vict. c. 48))
Fees (Officers of the Exchequer) Act 1786 (repealed)	26 Geo. 3. c. 99	4 July 1786
An Act to ascertain the Fees to be taken by the Officers of the Receipt of His Majesty's Exchequer, on the Issues of Money which have been made, and shall hereafter be made for the Payment of certain Pensions at the Receipt of His Majesty's Exchequer. (Repealed by Statute Law Revision Act 1861 (24 & 25 Vict. c. 101))
House of Commons (Electors) Act 1786 (repealed)	26 Geo. 3. c. 100	27 June 1786
An Act to prevent occasional Inhabitants from voting in the Election of Members to serve in Parliament for Cities and Boroughs in that Part of Great Britain called England and the Dominion of Wales. (Repealed by Statute Law Revision (No. 2) Act 1888 (51 & 52 Vict. c. 57))
Erection of Lighthouses Act 1786 (repealed)	26 Geo. 3. c. 101	27 June 1786
An Act for erecting certain Light Houses in the northern Parts of Great Britain. (Repealed by Merchant Shipping Repeal Act 1854 (17 & 18 Vict. c. 120))
Westminster (Streets) Act 1786 (repealed)	26 Geo. 3. c. 102	13 June 1786
An Act for enlarging the Term and Powers of an Act passed in the Fifth Year of His present Majesty's Reign (Note: Westminster Streets Act 1765 (5 Geo. 3. c. 13)) for empowering the Commissioners for putting in Execution the several Acts passed for paving, cleansing, and lighting the Squares, Streets, and Lanes within the City and Liberty of Westminster and Parts adjacent, to collect certain Tolls on Sundays upon the several Roads therein mentioned, and apply the same for the Purposes of the said Acts. (Repealed by Statute Law Revision Act 1948 (11 & 12 Geo. 6. c. 62))
Land Tax (No. 3) Act 1786 (repealed)	26 Geo. 3. c. 103	5 July 1786
An Act for assessing the Commissioners, Clerks, and other Officers of the Office for victualling His Majesty's Navy, for their Salaries and the Profits of their respective Offices, to the Land Tax in the Manor of East Smithfield in the Tower Division in the County of Middlesex, notwithstanding the Removal of the said Office into any other Division or Place. (Repealed by Statute Law Revision Act 1871 (34 & 35 Vict. c. 116))
Customs (No. 2) Act 1786 (repealed)	26 Geo. 3. c. 104	27 June 1786
An Act for allowing a Drawback of the Duties upon Coals used in smelting Copper and Lead Ores, and in Fire Engines for draining Water out of the Copper and Lead Mines within the Isle of Anglesey. (Repealed by Customs Law Repeal Act 1825 (6 Geo. 4. c. 105))
Land Tax (No. 4) Act 1786 (repealed)	26 Geo. 3. c. 105	4 July 1786
An Act for continuing the Salaries and Profits of the Commissioners, Clerks, and other Officers of the Pay Office and Navy Office respectively, rateable to the Land Tax in the Wards of Broad Street and Tower, within the City of London, notwithstanding the said Offices should be removed into any other Division or Place. (Repealed by Statute Law Revision Act 1871 (34 & 35 Vict. c. 116))
British Fisheries Society Act 1786 (repealed)	26 Geo. 3. c. 106	10 July 1786
An Act for incorporating certain Persons therein named, by the Name and Style of The British Society, for extending the Fisheries and improving the Sea Coasts of this Kingdom, and to enable them when incorporated to subscribe a joint Stock, and therewith to purchase Lands, and build thereon Free Towns, Villages, and Fishing Stations in the Highlands and Islands in that Part of Great Britain called Scotland; and for other Purposes. (Repealed by Pulteney Harbour Act 1857 (20 & 21 Vict. c. xciii))
Militia Act 1786 (repealed)	26 Geo. 3. c. 107	27 June 1786
An Act for amending and reducing into one Act of Parliament the Laws relating to the Militia in that Part of Great Britain called England. (Repealed by Militia Act 1802 (42 Geo. 3. c. 90))
Westminster Coal Trade Act 1786 (repealed)	26 Geo. 3. c. 108	27 June 1786
An Act for explaining, amending, and reducing into one Act of Parliament the several Acts passed for more effectually preventing the Frauds and Abuses committed in the Admeasurement of Coals within the City and Liberty of Westminster and that Part of the Duchy of Lancaster adjoining thereto, and the several Parishes of Saint Giles in the Fields, Saint Mary-le-Bon, and such Part of the Parish of Saint Andrew, Holborn, as lies in the County of Middlesex. (Repealed by London, Westminster, Middlesex, Surrey, Kent and Essex Coal Trade Act 1807 (47 Geo. 3 Sess. 2. c. lxviii))
Clyde Marine Society Act 1786 (repealed)	26 Geo. 3. c. 109	10 July 1786
An Act for incorporating the Members of a Society to be called the Clyde Marine Society, for the better empowering and enabling them to carry on their charitable and useful Designs; and for levying certain Duties from Ship Masters and others for that Purpose. (Repealed by Statute Law (Repeals) Act 1981 (c. 19))
North Shields (Water Supply) Act 1786	26 Geo. 3. c. 110	27 June 1786
An Act for supplying North Shields and the Shipping resorting thereto with Water.
Bristol Bridge Act 1786	26 Geo. 3. c. 111	27 June 1786
An Act to amend and render more effectual an Act made in the Thirty-third Year of the Reign of His late Majesty King George the Second, (Note: Bristol Bridge Act 1759 (33 Geo. 2. c. 52)) for re-building, widening, and enlarging the Bridge over the River Avon in the City of Bristol, and erecting a Temporary Bridge adjoining, and for widening the Streets, Lanes, Ways, and Passages leading thereto; and for building another Bridge over some other Part of the said River within the said City (if necessary); and for opening proper Ways and Passages thereto; and for making a Way from the Bridge already built to Temple Street in the said City.
Westminster (Watching) Act 1786 (repealed)	26 Geo. 3. c. 112	13 June 1786
An Act for raising a competent Sum of Money to defray the Expence of a proper Number of Watchmen, Patroles, and Beadles within the Parishes of Saint Margaret and Saint John the Evangelist in the City of Westminster. (Repealed by London Government (City of Westminster) Order in Council 1901 (SR&O 1901/278))
Edinburgh (Improvement) Act 1786 (repealed)	26 Geo. 3. c. 113	10 July 1786
An Act for widening several Streets in the City of Edinburgh; for opening a Communication from Queen's Street to Broughton Loan; for enlarging the Burial Ground; and for extending the Royalty of the said City over Part of the Lands of Broughton. (Repealed by Edinburgh Charity Workhouse Act 1844 (7 & 8 Vict. c. vi) and Edinburgh Municipal and Police Act 1879 (42 & 43 Vict. c. cxxxii))
Southwark (Poor Relief) Act 1786 (repealed)	26 Geo. 3. c. 114	10 July 1786
An Act for ascertaining and collecting the Poor's Rates; and for better governing, regulating, and maintaining and employing the Poor in the Parish of Saint John Southwark in the County of Surrey. (Repealed by St. John Southwark Vestry Voting Act 1824 (5 Geo. 4. c. lxxiv) and London Government (Borough of Bermondsey) Order in Council 1901 (SR&O 1901/264))
Barking Act 1786 (repealed)	26 Geo. 3. c. 115	16 June 1786
An Act for providing a proper Workhouse, and better regulating the Poor within the Parish of Barking in the County of Essex, and for regulating the Common Wharf within the Town of Barking. (Repealed by Barking Town Wharf Act 1893 (56 & 57 Vict. c. lxiii) and Statute Law Revision Act 1950 (14 Geo. 6. c. 6))
Cheltenham (Streets) Act 1786 (repealed)	26 Geo. 3. c. 116	13 June 1786
An Act for paving the Footways and Passages in the Town of Cheltenham in the County of Gloucester; and for better cleansing and lighting the said Town; for taking down certain old Buildings now standing therein; and for removing and preventing other Encroachments, Nuisances, and Annoyances. (Repealed by Cheltenham Improvement Act 1821 (1 & 2 Geo. 4. c. cxxi))
All Saints' Church, Newcastle Act 1786	26 Geo. 3. c. 117	27 June 1786
An Act for pulling down and re-building the Church of All Saints, in the Town of Newcastle-upon Tyne; and for enlarging the Church-yard, and making convenient Avenues and Passages thereto.
Kent (Small Debts) (No. 3) Act 1786 (repealed)	26 Geo. 3. c. 118	13 June 1786
An Act for the more easy and speedy Recovery of small Debts within the Town and Port of Folkestone, and the Parishes of Folkestone, Cheriton, Newington next Hithe, Stanford, Postling, Lyminge, Elham, Paddlesworth, Acris, Swingfield, and Hawkinge, in the County of Kent. (Repealed by County Courts Act 1846 (9 & 10 Vict. c. 95))
Newport, Isle of Wight (Improvement) Act 1786 (repealed)	26 Geo. 3. c. 119	13 June 1786
An Act for paving, repairing, cleansing, lighting and watching the Streets, Lanes, Ways, Passages, and Places within the Borough of Newport in the Isle of Wight; and for the Removal of present and Prevention of future Encroachments, Nuisances, and Annoyances therein. (Repealed by Municipal Corporations Act 1835 (5 & 6 Will. 4. c. 76) and Local Government Supplemental Act 1867 (No. 5) (30 & 31 Vict. c. 83))
Southwark (Streets) Act 1786 (repealed)	26 Geo. 3. c. 120	27 June 1786
An Act for paving, cleansing, lighting, and watching the Streets, Lanes, and other Public Passages and Places within the Manor of Southwark, otherwise called The Clink or Bishop of Winchester's Liberty, in the Parish of Saint Saviour, Southwark, in the County of Surrey; for the Removal of present and preventing of future Encroachments, Nuisances, and Annoyances therein; for laying out Two New Streets, and widening and regulating several other of the Streets and Passages within the said Liberty; for discontinuing the Passage through Globe Alley; and for shutting up in the Night Time the Way leading from Clink Street, in the said Liberty, to the River Side. (Repealed by Southwark Improvement Act 1812 (52 Geo. 3. c. xiv))
Land Tax (No. 5) Act 1786 (repealed)	26 Geo. 3. c. 121	22 May 1786
An Act for appointing Commissioners for putting in Execution an Act of this Session of Parliament, intituled, "An Act for granting an Aid to His Majesty, by a Land Tax to be raised in Great Britain, for the Service of the Year One thousand seven hundred and eighty-six." (Note: Land Tax Act 1786 (26 Geo. 3. c. 3)) (Repealed by Statute Law Revision Act 1871 (34 & 35 Vict. c. 116))
Wareham and Purbeck Roads Act 1786 (repealed)	26 Geo. 3. c. 122	3 March 1786
An Act for continuing the Term of an Act made in the Sixth Year of His present Majesty, (Note: Wareham and Purbeck Roads Act 1766 (6 Geo. 3. c. 92)) for amending, widening, altering, clearing, and keeping in Repair several Roads leading from the Market Cross in the Town of Wareham and in Purbeck in the County of Dorset. (Repealed by Wareham and Purbeck Roads Act 1830 (11 Geo. 4 & 1 Will. 4. c. ci))
Crewkerne Roads Act 1786 (repealed)	26 Geo. 3. c. 123	3 March 1786
An Act for enlarging the Term and Powers of an Act of the Fifth Year of His present Majesty, (Note: Crewkerne Roads Act 1765 (5 Geo. 3. c. 61)) for repairing, widening, and keeping in Repair several Roads leading to and from Crewkerne in the County of Somerset. (Repealed by Roads to and from Crewkerne Act 1805 (45 Geo. 3. c. iii))
Cromford Bridge to Langley Mill Road Act 1786 (repealed)	26 Geo. 3. c. 124	22 March 1786
An Act to enlarge the Term and Powers of an Act passed in the Sixth Year of the Reign of His present Majesty, (Note: Cromford Bridge to Langley Mill Road Act 1766 (6 Geo. 3. c. 69)) for repairing, widening, and keeping in Repair, the Road leading from Cromford Bridge, in the County of Derby, to the Turnpike Road at or near Langley Mill, in the said County. (Repealed by Cromford Bridge and Langley Mill Road Act 1830 (11 Geo. 4 & 1 Will. 4. c. c))
Worksop to Attercliffe Road Act 1786 (repealed)	26 Geo. 3. c. 125	22 March 1786
An Act for enlarging the Term and Powers of an Act, made in the Fourth Year of the Reign of His present Majesty King George the Third, (Note: Worksop and Attercliffe Road Act 1764 (4 Geo. 3. c. 52)) for repairing and widening the Road from Worksop, in the County of Nottingham, through the Towns of Gateforth, Anston, Aston, Handsworth, and Darnall, to the North East End of Attercliffe, in the County of York, where the same joins the Turnpike Road from Bawtry to Sheffield. (Repealed by Worksop and Attercliffe Road Act 1825 (6 Geo. 4. c. cxlvi))
Liverpool to Preston Road Act 1786 (repealed)	26 Geo. 3. c. 126	22 March 1786
An Act for more effectually repairing the Road from Liverpool to Preston, in the County of Lancaster. (Repealed by Road from Liverpool to Preston Act 1810 (50 Geo. 3. c. lvii))
Norfolk Roads Act 1786 (repealed)	26 Geo. 3. c. 127	22 March 1786
An Act for continuing the Term, and altering and enlarging the Powers of an Act of the Fifth Year of His present Majesty, (Note: Norfolk Roads (No. 2) Act 1765 (5 Geo. 3. c. 101)) for repairing and widening the Roads from the Little Bridge over the End of the Drain next Wisbeach River, lying between Roper's Fields and the Bell Inn in Wisbeach, in the Isle of Ely, to the Sign of the Bear in Walsoken, in the County of Norfolk, and from Walsoken Bridge (lying over the same Drain) to the said Sign of the Bear, and to Lord's Bridge in Islington, and from thence to the West Ends of Maudlin Bridge and German's Bridge, in the County of Norfolk, and from the East End of German's Bridge aforesaid, to the West End of Long Bridge in South Lynn, in the Borough of King's Lynn, in the said County of Norfolk, and from Islington aforesaid to Cross Keys Wash, in the said County. (Repealed by Wisbech and King's Lynn Roads Act 1823 (4 Geo. 4. c. lv))
Great Torrington Roads Act 1786 (repealed)	26 Geo. 3. c. 128	22 March 1786
An Act for continuing the Term, and altering and enlarging the Powers of an Act, passed in the Fifth Year of the Reign of His present Majesty, (Note: Great Torrington Roads Act 1765 (5 Geo. 3. c. 58)) for repairing, widening, and keeping in Repair, several Roads in and near Great Torrington, in the County of Devon. (Repealed by Great Torrington Roads Act 1824 (5 Geo. 4. c. lxxxi) (Note: Incorrectly cited as "5 Geo. 4. c. lxxi" in the Chronological Table of the Statutes.))
Bodmin Roads Act 1786 (repealed)	26 Geo. 3. c. 129	24 March 1786
An Act to enlarge the Term and Powers of an Act made in the Ninth Year of the Reign of His present Majesty, (Note: Bodmin Roads Act 1769 (9 Geo. 3. c. 69)) King George the Third, for repairing and widening several Roads leading to and through the Borough of Bodmin in the County of Cornwall. (Repealed by Bodmin Roads Act 1829 (10 Geo. 4. c. xix))
Bedford and Hertford Roads Act 1786 (repealed)	26 Geo. 3. c. 130	11 April 1786
An Act for more effectually repairing the Road from the Black Bull Inn in Dunstable, (Note: The Black Bull was a coaching inn located on the A505 Watling Street, in Dunstable, Bedfordshire. It has been converted to apartments and renamed Vale Court. 51°53′22″N 0°31′34″W) in the County of Bedford, to the Way turning out of the said Road up to Shafford House, (Note: Just south of the Bow Bridge over the River Ver, on the A5183 road Redbourn Road between Redbourn and St Albans, Hertfordshire. 51°46′04″N 0°22′15″W) in the County of Hertford. (Repealed by Dunstable and Pondyards Road Act 1821 (1 & 2 Geo. 4. c. cvii))
South London Roads Act 1786 (repealed)	26 Geo. 3. c. 131	4 July 1786
An Act for making, widening, and keeping in Repair, certain Roads in the several Parishes of Lambeth, Newington, Saint George Southwark, Bermondsey, and Christ Church, in the County of Surrey, and for watching and lighting the said Roads. (Repealed by St. George's Fields Right of Common Act 1810 (50 Geo. 3. c. cxci) and Surrey New Roads Act 1822 (3 Geo. 4. c. cxii))
Kent Roads Act 1786 (repealed)	26 Geo. 3. c. 132	22 March 1786
An Act for enlarging the Term of Two Acts of the Fifth (Note: Kent Roads (No. 2) Act 1765 (5 Geo. 3. c. 71)) and Ninth (Note: Kent Roads (No. 5) Act 1769 (9 Geo. 3. c. 92)) Years of His present Majesty, so far as the same relate to the repairing of the Roads from Wat's Cross to Cowden, and from Seven Oaks Common to Crockhurst Hatch Corner, and from Penshurst Town to Southborough, in the County of Kent. (Repealed by Roads from Watts Cross and from Sevenoaks Common Act 1828 (9 Geo. 4. c. cviii))
Wisbeach Roads Act 1786 (repealed)	26 Geo. 3. c. 133	3 May 1786
An Act to enlarge the Term and Powers of Two Acts, made in the Fifth (Note: Norfolk Roads Act 1765 (5 Geo. 3. c. 83)) and Seventh (Note: Isle of Ely and Norfolk Roads Act 1766 (7 Geo. 3. c. 100)) Years of His present Majesty, for repairing certain Roads therein mentioned, leading from Chatteris Ferry (Note: Chatteris Ferry, on the Chatteris Road. 52°25′47″N 0°01′59″E) to the Town of Wisbeach Saint Peter's (Note: Wisbech, Cambridgeshire.) in the Isle of Ely, and other Places in the said Acts mentioned. (Repealed by Chatteris Ferry and Downham Bridge Road Act 1828 (9 Geo. 4. c. lxxiii))
Kent Roads (No. 2) Act 1786 (repealed)	26 Geo. 3. c. 134	11 April 1786
An Act for enlarging the Term of an Act of the Fifth Year of His present Majesty, (Note: Kent Roads Act 1765 (5 Geo. 3. c. 63)) for repairing and widening the Roads leading from the Turnpike Road at Kipping's Cross, in the Parish of Brenchley, in the County of Kent, through the Parishes of Brenchley, Horsmonsden, and Goudhurst, by the left Hand Side of Iden Green to the Turnpike Road on Wilsley Green, in the Parish of Cranbrooke, and from a Place near Goudhurst Gore, through the Parish of Marden to Stile Bridge in the said Parish, and from Underden Green in Marden aforesaid, to Wanshutt's Green in the County of Kent. (Repealed by Roads from Kipping's Cross, Goudhurst Gore and Underden Green Act 1828 (9 Geo. 4. c. xvi))
Wiveliscombe Roads Act 1786 (repealed)	26 Geo. 3. c. 135	11 April 1786
An Act for amending and widening several Roads leading from and through the Town of Wiveliscombe, in the County of Somerset, and other Roads adjoining or near thereto. (Repealed by Wiveliscombe Roads Act 1825 (6 Geo. 4. c. xciii) (Note: Incorrectly cited as "6 Geo. 4. c. xcii" in the Chronological Table of the Statutes.))
Minehead Roads Act 1786 (repealed)	26 Geo. 3. c. 136	11 April 1786
An Act for continuing the Term and altering and enlarging the Powers of an Act passed in the Fifth Year of His present Majesty's Reign, (Note: Somerset and Devon Roads Act 1765 (5 Geo. 3. c. 93)) for repairing and widening several Roads leading from the Port, Town and Borough of Minehead, and from Dunster and Watchet, in the County of Somerset. (Repealed by Minehead and Bampton Road and Branch Act 1822 (3 Geo. 4. c. xcix) and Minehead District of Roads Act 1828 (9 Geo. 4. c. lxxxiv))
Lincoln Roads Act 1786 (repealed)	26 Geo. 3. c. 137	11 April 1786
An Act for enlarging the Term and Powers of Act passed in the Fifth Year of the Reign of His present Majesty, intituled, "An Act for repairing and widening the Road from Great Grimsby Haven, at or near a Place called the Upper Sand End, to Wold Newton Church, and from Nuns Farm to the Mill Field in the Parish of Irby, in the County of Lincoln." (Note: Lincoln Roads Act 1765 (5 Geo. 3. c. 73)) (Repealed by Road from Great Grimsby Haven to Irby Act 1828 (9 Geo. 4. c. lxviii))
Lincoln Roads (No. 2) Act 1786 (repealed)	26 Geo. 3. c. 138	11 April 1786
An Act for enlarging the Term and Powers of an Act made in the Sixth Year of the Reign of His present Majesty King George the Third, (Note: Lincoln and Notts Roads Act 1766 (6 Geo. 3. c. 83)) and also of Two Acts made, One in the Twelfth Year of the Reign of King George the First, (Note: Foston Bridge and Witham Common Road Act 1725 (12 Geo. 1. c. 16)) and the other in the Twelfth Year of the Reign of King George the Second, (Note: Lincoln and Nottinghamshire Roads Act 1738 (12 Geo. 2. c. 34)) so far as the said Two Acts relate to the Road from Spittlegate Hill to Foston Bridge, in the County of Lincoln. (Repealed by Road from Foston Bridge (Lincolnshire) Act 1808 (48 Geo. 3. c. lxiii))
Cheshire Roads Act 1786 (repealed)	26 Geo. 3. c. 139	3 May 1786
An Act for widening, amending, and keeping in Repair the Road from Flookersbrook Bridge within the Township of Newton, near Chester, to the South End of Wilderspool Causeway, and from the Market Town of Frodsham to Ashton Lane End in the Township of Ashton, in the County of Chester. (Repealed by Road from Frodsham to Appleton (Cheshire) Act 1827 (7 & 8 Geo. 4. c. lxii) and Chester and Ashton Lane End Road Act 1828 (9 Geo. 4. c. lxxi))
Birstal to Huddersfield Roads Act 1786 (repealed)	26 Geo. 3. c. 140	3 May 1786
An Act for continuing and amending an Act of the Fifth Year of His present Majesty, (Note: Yorks Roads Act 1765 (5 Geo. 3. c. 72)) for amending and widening the Road from the Sign of the Coach and Horses in Birstall, (Note: Birstall, West Yorkshire.) to the Turnpike Road at Nunbrook, (Note: The meeting point of the A62 and the A644 roads (the Dewsbury to Elland Turnpike), where the roads cross the Nun Brook. 53°41′10″N 1°43′35″W) and from Bradley Lane (Note: Bradley, Huddersfield.) to the Town of Huddersfield, (Note: Huddersfield, West Yorkshire.) in the West Riding of the County of York. (Repealed by Birstal and Huddersfield Roads Act 1828 (9 Geo. 4. c. lxxxiii))
Lincoln Roads (No. 3) Act 1786 (repealed)	26 Geo. 3. c. 141	3 May 1786
An Act for enlarging the Term and Powers of so much of an Act, passed in the Fifth Year of the Reign of His present Majesty King George the Third, intituled, "An Act for repairing and widening the Roads from Bawtry Bridge, in the County of Nottingham, to Hainton in the County of Lincoln, and from North Willingham to the North End of the Lane betwixt Dexthorpe and Langton, and from West Raisin to Pilford Bridge, and from the Great Road near Bishop Bridge to Bishop Norton Common, and from the Hamlet of Morton to Epworth, and from Haxey Field to the Trent at Kinnald Ferry, in the said County of Lincoln;" (Note: Notts and Lincoln Roads Act 1765 (5 Geo. 3. c. 85)) as relates to the First and Second Districts of Roads therein described. (Repealed by Road from Bawtry Bridge to Hainton (Lincolnshire) Act 1827 (7 & 8 Geo. 4. c. lvii))
Malton and Pickering Road Act 1786 (repealed)	26 Geo. 3. c. 142	22 May 1786
An Act for enlarging the Term and Powers of an Act passed in the Fifth Year of the Reign of His present Majesty, (Note: Malton and Pickering Road Act 1765 (5 Geo. 3. c. 108)) for amending and widening the Road from the North End of Old Malton Gate, in the Town and Borough of New Malton, to the Town of Pickering in the County of York. (Repealed by Road from North Malton Gate to Pickering Act 1825 (6 Geo. 4. c. clviii))
Hockliffe and Stony Stratford Road Act 1786 (repealed)	26 Geo. 3. c. 143	22 May 1786
An Act to continue the Term of Two Acts made in the Thirteenth (Note: Hockliffe and Stony Stratford Road Act 1739 (13 Geo. 2. c. 9)) and Twenty-seventh (Note: Hockliffe and Stony Stratford Road Act 1754 (27 Geo. 2. c. 21)) Years of the Reign of His late Majesty King George the Second, for repairing the Road between Hockliffe in the County of Bedford, and Stony Stratford in the County of Buckingham. (Repealed by Hockliffe and Stony Stratford Road Act 1830 (11 Geo. 4 & 1 Will. 4. c. lxxxiii))
Roads from York and from Grimston Act 1786 (repealed)	26 Geo. 3. c. 144	22 May 1786
An Act for continuing the Term and altering and enlarging the Powers of an Act passed in the Fifth Year of the Reign of His present Majesty, (Note: Roads from York and from Grimston Act 1765 (5 Geo. 3. c. 99)) for amending and widening the Road from the City of York by Grimston Smithy to Kexby Bridge, and from Grimston Smithy aforesaid, to a certain Gate at the Upper End of Garraby Hill, in the County of York. (Repealed by Roads from York and from Grimston Act 1807 (47 Geo. 3 Sess. 2. c. cxxxiii))
Kent Roads (No. 3) Act 1786 (repealed)	26 Geo. 3. c. 145	22 May 1786
An Act for continuing the Term of an Act of the Seventh Year of His present Majesty, (Note: Tenterden &c. Road Act 1766 (7 Geo. 3. c. 103)) for repairing and widening the Road leading from the Turnpike Road in the Town of Tenterden, to and over Bull Green, and to and through the Town of Great Chart, to a House known by the Sign of the Castle at the Entrance of the Town of Ashford in the County of Kent, and also the Road leading from Bull Green aforesaid to Hothfield Heath, and also the Road leading from Bull Green aforesaid, through High Halden to Dashmanden in the Parish of Biddenden in the said County of Kent. (Repealed by Tenterden and Ashford Road Act 1819 (59 Geo. 3. c. xcvii) and Annual Turnpike Acts Continuance Act 1877 (40 & 41 Vict. c. 64))
Lincoln Roads (No. 4) Act 1786 (repealed)	26 Geo. 3. c. 146	22 May 1786
An Act for enlarging the Term and Powers of an Act, passed in the Fifth Year of His present Majesty's Reign, intituled, "An Act for repairing and widening the Road from Barton Waterside House (Note: Waterside House, Barton Waterside, Lincolnshire. 53°41′47″N 0°26′38″W) to Riseham Hedge Corner, and several other Roads in the County of Lincoln therein mentioned;" (Note: Lincoln Roads (No. 2) Act 1765 (5 Geo. 3. c. 88)) and for repairing and widening the Road from the Old Bridge in the Town of Brigg in the said County to Wrawby Bar and Bigby Bar in the said Town, and also the Road from the End of the said Turnpike Road at Caistor in the said County of Lincoln, to the South Gate in the said Town of Caistor. (Repealed by Road from Barton Waterside House (Lincolnshire) Act 1827 (7 & 8 Geo. 4. c. lxvii))
Sussex Roads Act 1786 (repealed)	26 Geo. 3. c. 147	22 May 1786
An Act to enlarge the Term and Powers of Two Acts, made in the Fourth Year of the Reign of King George the Second, (Note: Surrey and Sussex Roads Act 1730 (4 Geo. 2. c. 8)) and the Sixth Year of the Reign of His present Majesty, (Note: Godstone to Highgate Road Act 1766 (6 Geo. 3. c. 58)) for repairing the Road from Godstone in the County of Surrey, to Highgate in the Parish of East Grinstead in the County of Sussex. (Repealed by Road from Godstone to Highgate (Sussex) Act 1828 (9 Geo. 4. c. cx))
Welford Bridge to Milston Lane Road Act 1786 (repealed)	26 Geo. 3. c. 148	22 May 1786
An Act for enlarging the Term and Powers of an Act, passed in the Fifth Year of His present Majesty's Reign, (Note: Welford and Leicester Road Act 1765 (5 Geo. 3. c. 78)) for repairing, widening, and keeping in Repair the Road from Welford Bridge in the County of Northampton, through Husband's Bosworth and Great Wigston, to Milston Lane in the Town of Leicester. (Repealed by Road from Welford Bridge Act 1805 (45 Geo. 3. c. lxxviii))
Brimington and Chesterfield Roads Act 1786 (repealed)	26 Geo. 3. c. 149	22 May 1786
An Act for enlarging the Term and Powers of an Act made in the Sixth Year of the Reign of His present Majesty King George the Third, intituled, "An Act for repairing and widening the Roads from Brimington and Chesterfield in the County of Derby, over the High Moors, to the several Places therein mentioned." (Note: Brimington and Chesterfield Roads Act 1766 (6 Geo. 3. c. 80)) (Repealed by Brimington, Chesterfield and High Moors Roads (Derbyshire) Act 1833 (3 & 4 Will. 4. c. lxxxviii) and Chesterfield, Dunstone and High Moors Turnpike Act 1865 (28 & 29 Vict. c. ccxv))
Carmarthen Roads Act 1786 (repealed)	26 Geo. 3. c. 150	22 May 1786
An Act for continuing the Term and altering the Powers of an Act, of the Fifth Year of His present Majesty, (Note: Carmarthen Roads Act 1765 (5 Geo. 3. c. 76)) for repairing, widening, and keeping in Repair the several Roads leading from Kidwelly in the County of Carmarthen, and also several Roads leading from Llandilo in the said County, so far as relates to the Llandilo District of the said Roads; and for amending and keeping in Repair several other Roads in the said County. (Repealed by Roads in Carmarthen Act 1828 (9 Geo. 4. c. lxxxi) and South Wales Turnpike Trusts Act 1844 (7 & 8 Vict. c. 91))
Derby Roads Act 1786 (repealed)	26 Geo. 3. c. 151	22 May 1786
An Act for making, repairing, and widening the Road from Heage in the County of Derby through Alfreton to Tibshelf in the same County, and also a Branch from the same Road at or near Shirland Lodge, to Higham in the same County. (Repealed by Alfreton and Higham and Tibshelf Roads (Derbyshire) Act 1829 (10 Geo. 4. c. lxv))
Chesterfield to Worksop Road Act 1786 (repealed)	26 Geo. 3. c. 152	22 May 1786
An Act for enlarging the Term and Powers of Two Acts, made in the Twelfth (Note: Derbyshire Roads Act 1738 (12 Geo. 2. c. 12)) and Thirty-first (Note: Derby and Notts Roads Act 1757 (31 Geo. 2. c. 60)) Years of King George the Second, for repairing the Road from Chesterfield in the County of Derby, to Worksop in the County of Nottingham and other Roads therein mentioned, so far as the same relate to the Road from Chesterfield to Worksop. (Repealed by Road from Chesterfield to Worksop Act 1808 (48 Geo. 3. c. lvi) and Chesterfield and Worksop Road Act 1829 (10 Geo. 4. c. lxxx))
Stafford and Chester Roads Act 1786 (repealed)	26 Geo. 3. c. 153	13 June 1786
An Act for enlarging the Term and Powers of an Act made in the Sixth Year of the Reign of His present Majesty, (Note: Stafford and Chester Roads Act 1766 (6 Geo. 3. c. 89)) for repairing and widening the Road leading from the Bottom of Church Lane (Note: Church Street, Newcastle-under-Lyme, Staffordshire.) in the Town of Newcastle-under-Line in the County of Stafford, to the Turnpike Road leading from Woor to Chester, near the Town of Namptwich in the County of Chester, (Note: The junction of Newcastle Road and London Road, Nantwich, Chester. 53°03′48″N 2°30′11″W) and from Chesterton, through Audley and Balterley to Ghorsty Hill. (Repealed by Road from Newcastle-under-Lyme to Nantwich Act 1829 (10 Geo. 4. c. cxv))
Tonbridge to Maidstone Road Act 1786 (repealed)	26 Geo. 3. c. 154	13 June 1786
An Act for enlarging the Term and Powers of Two Acts passed in the Fifth (Note: Kent Roads (No. 2) Act 1765 (5 Geo. 3. c. 71)) and Sixth (Note: Kent Roads Act 1766 (6 Geo. 3. c. 91)) Years of the Reign of His present Majesty, for repairing and widening the Road from Tonbridge to Maidstone, and from Wat's Cross to Cowden in the County of Kent, so far as the same relate to the Road from Tonbridge to Maidstone. (Repealed by Tonbridge and Maidstone Road Act 1829 (10 Geo. 4. c. lxii))
Selby to Leeds Road Act 1786 (repealed)	26 Geo. 3. c. 155	13 June 1786
An Act to enlarging the Term and Powers of an Act passed in the Twenty-fourth Year of the Reign of His late Majesty King George the Second, (Note: Tadcaster, etc., Roads Act 1750 (24 Geo. 2. c. 22)) so far as relates to the Road from Selby to Leeds in the West Riding of the County of York. (Repealed by Selby and Leeds Road Act 1820 (1 Geo. 4. c. lxv))
Lymington Roads Act 1786 (repealed)	26 Geo. 3. c. 156	16 June 1786
An Act to enlarge the Term and alter the Powers of an Act made in the Fifth Year of the Reign of His present Majesty, (Note: Lymington Roads Act 1765 (5 Geo. 3. c. 59)) for repairing, and widening several Roads leading from the Quay at Lymington in the County of Southampton. (Repealed by Lymington Roads Act 1828 (9 Geo. 4. c. cvii))
Sussex and Kent Roads Act 1786 (repealed)	26 Geo. 3. c. 157	11 April 1786
An Act for enlarging the Term and Powers of an Act of the Fifth Year of His present Majesty, (Note: Sussex and Kent Roads Act 1765 (5 Geo. 3. c. 52)) for repairing and widening the Road leading from the Town of Wadhurst, in the County of Sussex, to the Turnpike Road at Lamberhurst Pound and Pullen's Hill, in the County of Kent, and from the Top of Pullen's Hill through the Parishes of Horsmonden, Marden, Yalden, and West Farley, to West Farley Street, in the said County of Kent. (Repealed by Road from Wadhurst and from Pullen's Hill Act 1828 (9 Geo. 4. c. xvii))
Southampton Roads Act 1786 (repealed)	26 Geo. 3. c. 158	5 July 1786
An Act to continue the Term and Powers of an Act made in the Fifth Year of the Reign of His present Majesty, (Note: Hants Roads Act 1765 (5 Geo. 3. c. 95)) so far as the same relates to the repairing and widening the Road leading from the River at Swathling through Botley to the Turnpike Road at Sherrill Heath in the County of Southampton. (Repealed by Swathling, Botley and Sherril Heath Road (Hampshire) Act 1829 (10 Geo. 4. c. lxxxi))
Lincoln and Rutland Roads Act 1786 (repealed)	26 Geo. 3. c. 159	10 July 1786
An Act for reviving, continuing, and enlarging the Term and Powers of an Act passed in the Second Year of His present Majesty, (Note: Lincoln and Rutland Roads Act 1762 (2 Geo. 3. c. 73)) for repairing and widening the Roads from a certain Bridge called James Deeping Stone Bridge to Peter's Gate in Stamford, in the County of Lincoln, and from thence to the South End of the Town of Morcot, in the County of Rutland. (Repealed by Road from James Deeping Stone Bridge to Stamford and to Morcott Act 1829 (10 Geo. 4. c. lxxviii))
Newcastle to Carlisle Road Act 1786 (repealed)	26 Geo. 3. c. 160	13 June 1786
An Act for more effectually repairing and keeping in Repair so much of the Road from the Town of Newcastle-upon-Tyne to the City of Carlisle, as is within the County of Northumberland. (Repealed by Newcastle-upon-Tyne and Carlisle Road (Northumberland District) Act 1828 (9 Geo. 4. c. lxxii))

=== Private acts ===
Short title	Citation	Royal assent
Long title
Naturalization of Louis Weltje and Alexander von Mayersbach Act 1786	26 Geo. 3. c. 1 Pr.	3 March 1786
An Act for naturalizing Louis Weltje and Alexander Von Mayersbach.
Emmerich's Naturalization Act 1786	26 Geo. 3. c. 2 Pr.	3 March 1786
An Act for naturalizing Andreas Emmerich.
Christopherson's Naturalization Act 1786	26 Geo. 3. c. 3 Pr.	3 March 1786
An Act for naturalizing John Henry Christopherson.
Naturalization of John Rougemont and Lewis Guy Act 1786	26 Geo. 3. c. 4 Pr.	3 March 1786
An Act for naturalizing John Henry Rougemont and Lewis Guy.
Clitheroe Inclosure Act 1786	26 Geo. 3. c. 5 Pr.	22 March 1786
An Act for dividing and enclosing the Commons and Waste Grounds within the Borough or Township of Clitheroe, in the County Palatine of Lancaster.
Salvidge's Name Act 1786	26 Geo. 3. c. 6 Pr.	22 March 1786
An Act to enable Cornelius Salvidge, (now called Cornelius Tutton,) and the Heirs of his Body, to take the Surname of Tutton, pursuant to the Will of Samuel Tutton Esquire, deceased.
Meyer's Naturalization Act 1786	26 Geo. 3. c. 7 Pr.	22 March 1786
An Act for naturalizing John Conrad Meyer.
Naturalization of John Richard and George Matthiessen Act 1786	26 Geo. 3. c. 8 Pr.	22 March 1786
An Act for naturalizing John Peter Richard and George Christian Matthiessen.
Hederstedt's Naturalization Act 1786	26 Geo. 3. c. 9 Pr.	22 March 1786
An Act for naturalizing Gustaf Hederstedt.
Lord Ducie's Name Act 1786	26 Geo. 3. c. 10 Pr.	24 March 1786
An Act to enable the Right Honourable Francis Lord Ducie and his Issue to take the Surname of Moreton and to bear and use the Arms of Honour of the Right Honourable Matthew Lord Ducie deceased, pursuant to the Will of the said Matthew Lord Ducie.
Tress's Estate Act 1786	26 Geo. 3. c. 11 Pr.	11 April 1786
An Act for vesting the settled Estate of Stephen Tress, in the County of Sussex, in Trustees to convey the same, pursuant to an Agreement for the Sale thereof; and for laying out the Money in the Purchase of other Lands and Hereditaments, to be settled to the like Uses.
Shottery Inclosure Act 1786	26 Geo. 3. c. 12 Pr.	11 April 1786
An Act for dividing and enclosing certain Common Fields, Common Meadows, Pastures, and other Commonable Lands, within the Hamlet of Shottery, in the Parish of Old Stratford, otherwise Stratford-upon-Avon, in the County of Warwick.
Oddington Inclosure Act 1786	26 Geo. 3. c. 13 Pr.	11 April 1786
An Act for dividing and enclosing certain Open and Common Fields, Common Meadows and Pastures, and Commonable or Waste Lands, within the Parish of Oddington, in the County of Gloucester.
Narberth, Templeton, Molleston and Robestone Wathan (Pembrokeshire) Inclosure Act 1786	26 Geo. 3. c. 14 Pr.	11 April 1786
An Act for dividing and enclosing several Parcels of Waste Grounds, within the Manors of Narberth, Templeton, Molleston, and Robestone Wathan, in the Parishes of Narberth and Robestone Wathan, in the County of Pembroke.
West Pennard Inclosure Act 1786	26 Geo. 3. c. 15 Pr.	11 April 1786
An Act for dividing, enclosing, and allotting certain Moors, Commons, or Waste Lands lying and being within the Parish of West Pennard in the County of Somerset.
Crathorne's Name Act 1786	26 Geo. 3. c. 16 Pr.	11 April 1786
An Act to enable George Tasburgh Esquire (lately called George Crathorne) and his Heirs Male to take and bear the Surname and Arms of Tasburgh only, pursuant to the Will, and also to a certain Settlement made by George Tasburgh Esquire deceased.
Bishopp's Estate Act 1786	26 Geo. 3. c. 17 Pr.	3 May 1786
An Act for vesting Part of the devised Estate of Robert Bishopp deceased, in the County of Surrey, in Trustees, to be sold; and for laying out the Money arising from the Sale, in the Purchase of another Estate, to be settled to the same Uses.
Sheffield Parish Vicarage estate: enabling letting of glebe land and other improvements.	26 Geo. 3. c. 18 Pr.	3 May 1786
An Act to enable the Vicar of the Parish and Parish Church of Sheffield in the County of York, to grant Leases of the Glebe Land, and otherwise improve the Estate belonging to the said Vicarage.
Crich and Southwingfield (Derbyshire) Inclosure Act 1786	26 Geo. 3. c. 19 Pr.	3 May 1786
An Act for dividing and enclosing the several Commons and Waste Grounds within the Manors of Crich and Southwingfield, in the County of Derby.
Upper Wallop, Hursbourn Pryors and Tufton (Hampshire) inclosures.	26 Geo. 3. c. 20 Pr.	3 May 1786
An Act for dividing and enclosing the several Common Fields, Common Downs, Common Pastures, and other Commonable Places in the several Parishes of Upper Wallop, Hursbourn-Pryors, and Tufton, in the County of Southampton.
Bray Inclosure Act 1786	26 Geo. 3. c. 21 Pr.	3 May 1786
An Act for dividing and enclosing certain Open and Common Fields, a Common Meadow, and Common Pasture and Commonable Lands within the Parish of Bray, in the County of Berks.
Tichwell Inclosure Act 1786	26 Geo. 3. c. 22 Pr.	3 May 1786
An Act for dividing and enclosing the Open Fields, Meadows, Pastures, and other Commonable Lands and Grounds within the Parish of Tichwell, in the County of Norfolk.
Harvington Inclosure Act 1786	26 Geo. 3. c. 23 Pr.	3 May 1786
An Act for dividing and enclosing the Open and Common Fields, and all other Commonable Land within the Parish of Harvington, in the County of Worcester.
Methley Inclosure Act 1786	26 Geo. 3. c. 24 Pr.	3 May 1786
An Act for dividing and enclosing the Commons, Common Fields, Wastes and other Commonable Lands and Grounds, within the Manor and Parish of Methley, in the County of York.
Estates of Lord Carteret and Sidney Sussex College, Cambridge: exchange of advowsons of St. Mary, Week (Cornwall) and Wilstead (Bedfordshire).	26 Geo. 3. c. 25 Pr.	22 May 1786
An Act to effectuate and establish an Exchange between the Right Honourable Henry Frederick Lord Carteret and his Trustees, with the Master, Fellows, and Scholars of the College of the Lady Frances Sidney Sussex in the University of Cambridge, of the Advowson and Right of Patronage of and to the Rectory of Saint Mary Week otherwise Week Saint Mary in the County of Cornwall, for the Advowson and Right of Patronage of and to the Vicarage of Wilshamstead otherwise Wilstead, in the County of Bedford.
Viscount Gallway's Estate Act 1786	26 Geo. 3. c. 26 Pr.	22 May 1786
An Act for vesting certain Estates in the County of Nottingham, entailed by the Will of the Right Honourable Henry William Arundell Viscount Gallway, in Trustees to be sold, and for laying out the Money arising therefrom, in the Purchase of Estates situate in the West Riding of the County of York, to be settled to the same Uses.
Barlow's Estate Act 1786	26 Geo. 3. c. 27 Pr.	22 May 1786
An Act for vesting Part of the Estates in the Town and County of Southampton, devised by the Will of Benjamin Barlow, deceased, in Trustees to be sold, and for laying out the Purchase Money in another Estate, to be settled in Lieu thereof, to the same Uses.
Moor Monkton Inclosure Act 1786	26 Geo. 3. c. 28 Pr.	22 May 1786
An Act for dividing and enclosing a Common and certain other Open Grounds in the Township and Parish of Moor Monkton, in the County of the City of York.
Atherstone Inclosure Act 1786	26 Geo. 3. c. 29 Pr.	22 May 1786
An Act for dividing and allotting certain Commonable Grounds or Waste Woodlands in the Township of Atherstone in the County of Warwick.
Raveley Inclosure Act 1786	26 Geo. 3. c. 30 Pr.	22 May 1786
An Act for dividing, enclosing, and exchanging the Open Fields and other Lands and Grounds within the Parish of Raveley in the County of Huntingdon.
Sinnington with Marton and Edstone (Yorkshire, North Riding) inclosures.	26 Geo. 3. c. 31 Pr.	22 May 1786
An Act for dividing and enclosing the several Common Pastures, Commons, or Waste Grounds, within the Parishes of Sinnington with Marton and Edstone in the North Riding of the County of York.
Aston or Aston Abbotts (Salop.) Inclosure Act 1786	26 Geo. 3. c. 32 Pr.	22 May 1786
An Act for dividing and enclosing the Commons or Waste Lands within the Manor of Aston, otherwise Aston Abbotts, in the County of Salop.
Rolle's Estate Act 1786	26 Geo. 3. c. 33 Pr.	26 May 1786
An Act for vesting Part of the settled Estates of Denys Rolle and John Rolle Esquires, in Trustees, upon Trust, to sell the same, and to purchase Estates contiguous to the principal Estates of the said Denys Rolle and John Rolle, to be settled to the Uses of the Estates vested in Trustees for Sale.
Little Smeaton and Stubbs Walden (Yorkshire, North Riding) inclosures.	26 Geo. 3. c. 34 Pr.	26 May 1786
An Act for dividing and enclosing the several Open Fields, Stinted Pasture, Ings, Commons, Waste Lands and Grounds in the Townships of Little Smeaton, and Stubbs Walden in the Parish of Womersley, in the West Riding of the County of York.
Weston upon Trent Inclosure Act 1786	26 Geo. 3. c. 35 Pr.	26 May 1786
An Act for dividing and enclosing the several Common Fields, Common Meadows, Common Pastures, Commons and Waste Grounds in the Parish of Weston upon Trent, in the County of Derby.
Lord and Lady Stourton's, Lord and Lady Clifford's and Robert and Elizabeth Butler's estates: power to charge their estates at Holme (Yorkshire, East Riding) for making improvements, and power to grant building and other leases.	26 Geo. 3. c. 36 Pr.	13 June 1786
An Act for enabling the Right Honourable Charles Philip Lord Stourton and the Right Honourable Mary Lady Stourton his Wife, the Right Honourable Hugh Lord Clifford and the Right Honourable Appolonia Lady Clifford his Wife, and Robert Butler Esquire and the Honourable Elizabeth Butler, his Wife, to charge their Estates at Holme in the East Riding of the County of York with a competent Sum of Money, for the Purpose of improving the same; and also to grant Building and other Leases of the said Estates, and of their other Estates in the Counties of York and Stafford.
Damer's Estate Act 1786	26 Geo. 3. c. 37 Pr.	13 June 1786
An Act to enable the surviving Parties to certain Articles of Agreement, made previous to the Marriage of the Honourable John Damer deceased with the Honourable Ann Seymour Conway, (now Ann Damer Widow,) to insert in the Settlement to be executed in pursuance of the said Articles, proper Powers for raising the Sum of Forty Thousand Pounds for the Purposes in the said Articles mentioned.
Lord and Lady Camelford's marriage settlement: rectification of mistakes and further provision for children.	26 Geo. 3. c. 38 Pr.	13 June 1786
An Act for rectifying Mistakes in the Marriage Settlement of Lord and Lady Camelford, and for making a further Provision for the younger Children of the said Marriage.
Wasey's Estate Act 1786	26 Geo. 3. c. 39 Pr.	13 June 1786
An Act to re-settle certain Freehold and Copyhold Lands and Hereditaments in the County of Norfolk, to the Uses and subject to the Powers limited or expressed of and concerning the same, by the Settlement made on the Marriage of William John Spearman Wasey Esquire, and Elizabetha Honoria his Wife.
Shipton's Estate Act 1786	26 Geo. 3. c. 40 Pr.	13 June 1786
An Act for vesting the Estate late of John Shipton Esquire, deceased, in the County of Warwick in Trustees, to be sold and disposed of for the Payment of his Debts, and certain of the Legacies given by his Will and Codicil; and for laying out the Residue of the Money arising by such Sale in the Purchase of other Estates to be settled to the Uses and for the Purposes therein mentioned.
Walter Stanhope's and John Shuttleworth's Estates Act 1786	26 Geo. 3. c. 41 Pr.	13 June 1786
An Act for vesting Part of the settled Estates of Walter Stanhope and John Shuttleworth Esquires, in the Counties of York and Derby in Trustees to be sold or exchanged, and for laying out the Purchase Money of the Estates so to be sold in other Estates to be settled to the same Uses; and for enabling the Tenants for Life to grant Building and repairing Leases; and for confirming the Election made between the said Parties respecting the said Estates.
Assheton and Salisbury Estates Act 1786	26 Geo. 3. c. 42 Pr.	13 June 1786
An Act for effecting an Exchange between Rebecca Assheton Widow, and the Right Honourable James Earl of Salisbury of certain small Parts of their Estates in the County of Herts.
Williamson's Estate Act 1786	26 Geo. 3. c. 43 Pr.	13 June 1786
An Act for vesting an undivided Moiety (being the settled Estate of Samuel Williamson, a Lunatic) of and in certain Lands in Liverpool, in the County of Lancaster in Trustees, to be sold with the Approbation of the Court of Chancery; and for laying out the Money arising therefrom in the Purchase of other Estates to be settled to the same Uses.
Parry's Estate Act 1786	26 Geo. 3. c. 44 Pr.	13 June 1786
An Act for vesting Part of the settled Estates of Richard Parry Esquire in the County of Denbigh, in North Wales, in Trustees to be sold; and for applying the Monies arising by such Sale in discharging the Incumbrances affecting the same and other Estates of the said Richard Parry; and for substituting and settling another Estate of greater Value in Lieu thereof.
Broughton Inclosure Act 1786	26 Geo. 3. c. 45 Pr.	13 June 1786
An Act for dividing and enclosing the Open and Common Fields, Common Meadows, Common Pastures, Commonable Lands and Waste Grounds in the Manor and Parish of Broughton in the County of Northampton.
Huddersfield Inclosure Act 1786	26 Geo. 3. c. 46 Pr.	13 June 1786
An Act for dividing and enclosing the Commons and Waste Grounds within the Manor of Huddersfield, in the County of York.
Canwick Inclosure Act 1786	26 Geo. 3. c. 47 Pr.	13 June 1786
An Act for dividing and enclosing certain Open and Common Fields, Meadows, Pastures, and Waste Lands, within the Parish of Canwick, in the County of the City of Lincoln, and for separating, dividing, and appropriating, an Open Common called Canwick or the South Common adjoining thereto, and for extinguishing certain Rights of Common in and upon the same, and also in and upon the said Open and Common Fields, Meadows, Pastures, and Waste Lands, and for making Compensation in Lieu thereof, respectively.
Berwick St. John (Wiltshire) Allotment Act 1786	26 Geo. 3. c. 48 Pr.	13 June 1786
An Act for dividing and allotting the Open and Common Fields, and other Commonable Lands and Grounds in the Parish of Berwick Saint John, in the County of Wilts.
Thomas Whichcot's Estate Act 1786	26 Geo. 3. c. 49 Pr.	16 June 1786
An Act for vesting Part of the Estate of Thomas Whichcote Esquire, deceased, in the County of Lincoln, in Trustees, for Sale, to pay off Incumbrances affecting the same, and for other Purposes therein mentioned.
Inge's Estate Act 1786	26 Geo. 3. c. 50 Pr.	16 June 1786
An Act to empower the Guardians of William Phillips Inge Esquire, and of his Sisters, to make or grant Building and other Leases during their respective Minorities, and also to make Exchanges of intermixed Lands in or near the Town of Birmingham in the County of Warwick.
Beaumont's Estate Act 1786	26 Geo. 3. c. 51 Pr.	16 June 1786
An Act for vesting the Estate comprized in the Settlement made on the Marriage of the Reverend Thomas Beaumont Clerk, deceased, in Trustees, to sell the same, and apply the Money to arise by such Sale in the Purchase of other Lands or Hereditaments, to be settled in like Manner in Lieu thereof.
Ralph Freeman's trust for the repair or rebuilding of Barking Vicarage: application of part of fund for purchase of land and for construction of a new vicarage.	26 Geo. 3. c. 52 Pr.	16 June 1786
An Act for applying Part of the Trust Fund which was given by the Will of Doctor Ralph Freeman, for repairing or re-building the Vicarage House of the Parish of Barking in the County of Essex, in purchasing a convenient Piece of Ground in the said Parish, and in building a new Vicarage House thereon.
Basingstoke Inclosure Act 1786	26 Geo. 3. c. 53 Pr.	16 June 1786
An Act for dividing, allotting, and enclosing the Open and Common Fields, Common Downs, Common Pastures, Common Meadows, Waste Lands and other commonable Places within the Parish of Basingstoke in the County of Southampton.
Marston Biggott or Bygood (Somerset) Parish Church Act 1786	26 Geo. 3. c. 54 Pr.	27 June 1786
An Act for enabling the Right Honourable Edmund Earl of Cork and Orrery in the Kingdom of Ireland, and Baron Boyle of Marston in England, to pull down the present Parish Church of Marston Bigott, otherwise Marston Bygood in the County of Somerset, and for building a new Parish Church there.
Bamford's Estate Act 1786	26 Geo. 3. c. 55 Pr.	27 June 1786
An Act to enable William Bamford Esquire, and the several other Persons therein mentioned, to grant Leases of certain Parts of the settled Estates in the several Counties of Lancaster and Chester, lately of or belonging to Ann Bamford Spinster, deceased, upon the Terms and Restrictions therein mentioned.
Rich's Estate Act 1786	26 Geo. 3. c. 56 Pr.	27 June 1786
An Act for vesting Part of the settled Estates of John Rich Gentleman and Elizabeth his Wife in the Counties of Leicester and Warwick in Trustees, to be sold, and for applying the Money arising therefrom in Payment of Incumbrances under the Direction of the Court of Chancery; and for laying out the Surplus of such Money in the Purchase of other Estates to be settled to the same Uses.
Duffield Inclosure Act 1786	26 Geo. 3. c. 57 Pr.	27 June 1786
An Act for dividing and enclosing certain Commons called Belper Ward and Cheven Ward in the County of Derby, and certain Waste Lands within the Liberties of Duffield, Belper, Hazlewood, and Makeney, within the Parish of Duffield in the said County of Derby.
Great and Little Chelworth Inclosure Act 1786	26 Geo. 3. c. 58 Pr.	27 June 1786
An Act for dividing, allotting, and enclosing the Open Common Fields, Common Meadows, and Pastures, and also a Piece of Common adjoining to Chelworth Common, all within the Manors and Tything of Great and Little Chelworth, or one of them, in the Parish of Cricklade Saint Sampson in the County of Wilts.
Lord Foley's and Samuel Skey's Estates Act 1786	26 Geo. 3. c. 59 Pr.	4 July 1786
An Act for vesting Part of the devised Estates of the Right Honourable Thomas Lord Foley, deceased, in the County of Worcester, in Samuel Skey Esquire, in Fee-simple, in Exchange for another Estate of equal Value, and for effecting a Sale of other Part of the said devised Estates to the said Samuel Skey, pursuant to an Agreement made by the said Lord Foley in his Life-time, and for investing the Money arising from such Sale in the Purchase of other Estates, under the Direction of the Court of Chancery, to be settled in Lieu thereof to the same Uses.
Trefusis' Naturalization Act 1786	26 Geo. 3. c. 60 Pr.	11 July 1786
An Act for naturalizing Albertine Marianne Trefusis.

=== Sources ===
- Pickering, Danby, ed. (1786). "Anno vicesimo sexto Georgii III". The Statutes at Large. Vol. 35. Cambridge: Charles Bathurst. pp. 429–935 – via Internet Archive.
- Pickering, Danby, ed. (1786). "Anno vicesimo quinto Georgii III". The Statutes at Large. Vol. 35. Cambridge: Charles Bathurst. pp. 429–935 – via Google Books.
- Journals of the House of Commons. Vol. 41. London: His Majesty's Stationery Office. 1803. pp. 3–979 – via Google Books.
- Journal of the House of Lords. Vol. 37: 1783-1787. London: His Majesty's Stationery Office. 1830. pp. 386–574 – via British History Online.
- Chronological Table of and Index to the Statutes. Vol. 1: To the End of the Session 59 Vict. Sess. 2 (1895) (13th ed.). London: Her Majesty's Stationery Office. 1896. pp. 145–146 – via Google Books.
- "Acts of the Parliament of Great Britain from 1786". legislation.gov.uk. The National Archives.
- Chronological Table of the Statutes: Covering the Period from 1235 to the End of 1971. London: Her Majesty's Stationery Office. 1972. pp. 167–170. ISBN 978-0-11-840096-1 – via Google Books.

== See also ==
- List of acts of the Parliament of Great Britain
