= Merchant Shipping Act 1786 =

Act of the Parliament of Great Britain

- Act of Parliament
- Parliament of Great Britain
- Long title: An Act to explain and amend an Act made in the Seventh Year of His late Majesty's Reign, intituled, "An Act to settle how far Owners of Ships shall be answerable for the Acts of the Masters or Mariners, and for giving a further Relief to the Owners of Ships.
- Citation: 26 Geo. 3. c. 86
- Territorial extent: Great Britain

Dates
- Royal assent: 11 July 1786
- Commencement: 1 September 1786 (Note: Section 1.)
- Repealed: 1 May 1855
Other legislation
| Amends | Responsibility of Shipowners Act 1733 |
| Repealed by | Merchant Shipping Repeal Act 1854 |

Status: Repealed

Text of statute as originally enacted

The Merchant Shipping Act 1786 (26 Geo. 3. c. 86) was an act of the Parliament of Great Britain passed in 1786.

The act stemmed from a petition made to Parliament by a delegation of shipowners in 1786, concerned that recent court cases had put them at risk of significantly greater liabilities in case of loss or damage to cargo. It was passed by Parliament without a division in either House. Section I of the act imposed a limit on the liability of shipowners in regards to goods lost or damaged in a robbery, regardless of whether the robbers were part of the crew of the ship or not. The liability for any loss or damage of goods was limited to the value of the vessel, her equipment, and any freight due for the voyage. This was an extension to the provisions of the Responsibility of Shipowners Act 1733 (7 Geo. 2. c. 15, as the case of Sutton v. Mitchell, (1785) 1 T.R. 18, had highlighted that the 1733 Act would give no protection to shipowners where a ship was robbed without the collusion of the crew. Section II provided that the liability of the owner in case of fire was entirely removed, a reaction to Forward v. Pittard, (1785) I T.R. 27, where a shipowner had been held liable for loss from an accidental fire. Section III provided that the shipowner was under no liability at all in the case of stolen valuables (gold, silver, jewels, watches, etc.) unless the bill of lading clearly stated their nature, quality and value.

== Subsequent developments ==
The whole was repealed by section 4 of the Merchant Shipping Repeal Act 1854 (17 & 18 Vict. c.120).

== See also ==
- Merchant Shipping Act

== Sources ==
- Fletcher, Eric G. M. The Carrier's Liability. Stevens & Sons, 1932.
