= Responsibility of Shipowners Act 1733 =

Act of the Parliament of Great Britain

- Act of Parliament
- Parliament of Great Britain
- Long title: An Act to settle how far Owners of Ships shall be answerable for the Acts of the Masters or Mariners.
- Citation: 7 Geo. 2. c. 15
- Territorial extent: Great Britain

Dates
- Royal assent: 16 April 1734
- Commencement: 24 June 1734 (Note: Section 1.)
- Repealed: 1 May 1855
Other legislation
Amended by	Merchant Shipping Act 1786
Repealed by	Merchant Shipping Repeal Act 1854

Status: Repealed

Text of statute as originally enacted

The Responsibility of Shipowners Act 1733 (7 Geo. 2. c. 15) was an act of the Parliament of Great Britain passed in 1734. It was introduced for the protection of shipowners, following a petition presented to the House of Commons, and passed without a division in either House. It imposed a limit on the liability of shipowners in regard to goods embezzled by the master or crew of the ship carrying them. The liability for any loss or damage of goods was limited to the value of the vessel, her equipment, and any freight due for the voyage.

The act was held to apply in the case of Sutton v. Mitchell (1785) 1 T.R. 18, where goods were stolen from a ship moored in the Thames by robbers colluding with a member of the crew. However, this emphasised the liability to which shipowners were still exposed in cases where goods were stolen without the involvement of the crew; as a result, a second petition was brought to the House, leading to the passage of the Merchant Shipping Act 1786 (26 Geo. 3. c. 86).

== Subsequent developments ==
The whole act was repealed by section 4 of the Merchant Shipping Repeal Act 1854 (17 & 18 Vict. c. 120).

== Sources ==
- Fletcher, Eric G. M. The Carrier's Liability, pp. 175-176. Stevens & Sons, 1932.
- Lord Mustill "Ships are different - or are they?" [1993] Lloyd's Maritime and Commercial Law Quarterly 490, pp 496-497.
