= List of acts of the Parliament of Great Britain from 1733 =

This is a complete list of acts of the Parliament of Great Britain for the year 1733.

For acts passed until 1707, see the list of acts of the Parliament of England and the list of acts of the Parliament of Scotland. See also the list of acts of the Parliament of Ireland.

For acts passed from 1801 onwards, see the list of acts of the Parliament of the United Kingdom. For acts of the devolved parliaments and assemblies in the United Kingdom, see the list of acts of the Scottish Parliament, the list of acts of the Northern Ireland Assembly, and the list of acts and measures of Senedd Cymru; see also the list of acts of the Parliament of Northern Ireland.

The number shown after each act's title is its chapter number. Acts are cited using this number, preceded by the year(s) of the reign during which the relevant parliamentary session was held; thus the Union with Ireland Act 1800 is cited as "39 & 40 Geo. 3. c. 67", meaning the 67th act passed during the session that started in the 39th year of the reign of George III and which finished in the 40th year of that reign. Note that the modern convention is to use Arabic numerals in citations (thus "41 Geo. 3" rather than "41 Geo. III"). Acts of the last session of the Parliament of Great Britain and the first session of the Parliament of the United Kingdom are both cited as "41 Geo. 3".

Acts passed by the Parliament of Great Britain did not have a short title; however, some of these acts have subsequently been given a short title by acts of the Parliament of the United Kingdom (such as the Short Titles Act 1896).

Before the Acts of Parliament (Commencement) Act 1793 came into force on 8 April 1793, acts passed by the Parliament of Great Britain were deemed to have come into effect on the first day of the session in which they were passed. Because of this, the years given in the list below may in fact be the year before a particular act was passed.

== 7 Geo. 2 ==
The seventh session of the 7th Parliament of Great Britain, which met from 17 January 1734 until 16 April 1734.

This session was also traditionally cited as 7 G. 2.

=== Public acts ===
| Short title | Citation | Royal assent |
Long title
| Taxation, etc. Act 1733 (repealed) | 7 Geo. 2. c. 1 | 21 February 1734 |
An Act for continuing the Duties upon Malt, Mum, Cyder, and Perry, in that Part of Great Britain called England; and for granting to His Majesty certain Duties upon Malt, Mum, Cyder, and Perry, in that Part of Great Britain called Scotland, for the Service of the Year One Thousand Seven Hundred and Thirty-four; and for making forth Duplicates of Exchequer Bills, Lottery Tickets, and Orders, lost, burnt, or otherwise destroyed. (Repealed by Statute Law Revision Act 1867 (30 & 31 Vict. c. 59))
| Mutiny Act 1733 (repealed) | 7 Geo. 2. c. 2 | 21 March 1734 |
An Act for punishing Mutiny and Desertion; and for the better Payment of the Army and their Quarters. (Repealed by Statute Law Revision Act 1867 (30 & 31 Vict. c. 59))
| Prince of Orange Act 1733 (repealed) | 7 Geo. 2. c. 3 | 21 March 1734 |
An Act for exhibiting a Bill in this present Parliament, for naturalizing his Highness the Prince of Orange. (Repealed by Statute Law Revision Act 1867 (30 & 31 Vict. c. 59))
| Royal Family Act 1733 (repealed) | 7 Geo. 2. c. 4 | 16 April 1734 |
An Act for naturalizing the most Serene Prince William Charles Henry Friso, Prince of Orange and Nassau. (Repealed by Statute Law Revision Act 1948 (11 & 12 Geo. 6. c. 62))
| Montrose Beer Duties Act 1733 (repealed) | 7 Geo. 2. c. 5 | 21 March 1734 |
An Act for enlarging the Term and Powers granted by an Act passed in the Sixth Year of the Reign of His late Majesty King George the First, intituled, "An Act for laying a Duty of Two Pennies Scots, or One Sixth Part of a Penny Sterling, upon every Pint of Ale or Beer that shall be vended or sold within the Town of Montrose, and Privileges thereof, for supplying the said Town with fresh Water;" (Note: Montrose Beer Duties Act 1719 (6 Geo. 1. c. 7)) and for other Purposes therein mentioned. (Repealed by Statute Law Revision Act 1948 (11 & 12 Geo. 6. c. 62))
| Salt Duties Act 1733 (repealed) | 7 Geo. 2. c. 6 | 21 March 1734 |
An Act for granting and continuing the Duties upon Salt, and upon Red and White Herrings, for the further Term of Seven Years; and for licensing the erecting of new Refineries of Rock Salt, in the Counties of Essex and Suffolk. (Repealed by Statute Law Revision Act 1867 (30 & 31 Vict. c. 59))
| Land Tax Act 1733 (repealed) | 7 Geo. 2. c. 7 | 16 April 1734 |
An Act for granting an Aid to His Majesty, by a Land Tax, to be raised for the Service of the Year One Thousand Seven Hundred and Thirty-four. (Repealed by Statute Law Revision Act 1867 (30 & 31 Vict. c. 59))
| Stock Jobbing Act 1733 or Sir John Barnard's Act (Note: John Barnard, politician and Mayor of London.) (repealed) | 7 Geo. 2. c. 8 | 16 April 1734 |
An Act to prevent the infamous Practice of Stockjobbing. (Repealed by Repeal of Sir John Barnard's Act 1860 (23 & 24 Vict. c. 28))
| Highways Act 1733 (repealed) | 7 Geo. 2. c. 9 | 16 April 1734 |
An Act to explain and make more effectual the Laws in being, to oblige the Possessors of Lands, adjacent to Common Highways, to cut and keep low such Hedges as are adjoining to the said Highways. (Repealed by Highways (No. 2) Act 1766 (7 Geo. 3. c. 42))
| Indemnity Act 1733 (repealed) | 7 Geo. 2. c. 10 | 16 April 1734 |
An Act to indemnify Persons who have omitted to qualify themselves for Employments or Offices, by taking the Oaths, and making and subscribing the Declaration against Transubstantiation, and receiving the Sacrament; and to allow them further Time for that Purpose; and to enable the Vice Chancellor of the University and Mayor of the Town of Cambridge to act as Justices of the Peace for the County of Cambridge, notwithstanding the Act for the further Qualification of Justices of the Peace. (Repealed by Statute Law Revision Act 1867 (30 & 31 Vict. c. 59))
| Charitable Corporation Lottery Act 1733 (repealed) | 7 Geo. 2. c. 11 | 16 April 1734 |
An Act for the Application and Disposal of the Residue of the Money raised, by Way of Lottery, on the Credit of an Act made in the last Session of Parliament, (Note: Lotteries Act 1732 (6 Geo. 2. c. 35)) for the Relief of such Sufferers in the Charitable Corporation as are Objects of Compassion, according to the Descriptions therein mentioned. (Repealed by Statute Law Revision Act 1867 (30 & 31 Vict. c. 59))
| Supply, etc. Act 1733 (repealed) | 7 Geo. 2. c. 12 | 16 April 1734 |
An Act for enabling His Majesty to apply the Sum of One Million Two Hundred Thousand Pounds, out of the Sinking Fund, for the Service of the Year One Thousand Seven Hundred and Thirty-four; and for appropriating the Supplies granted in this Session of Parliament. (Repealed by Statute Law Revision Act 1867 (30 & 31 Vict. c. 59))
| Provision for the Princess Royal Act 1733 (repealed) | 7 Geo. 2. c. 13 | 16 April 1734 |
An Act to enable His Majesty to continue and settle an Annuity of Five Thousand Pounds on the Princess Royal, during the Term of her natural Life, in case she shall survive His Majesty. (Repealed by Statute Law Revision Act 1867 (30 & 31 Vict. c. 59))
| Taxation Act 1733 (repealed) | 7 Geo. 2. c. 14 | 16 April 1734 |
An Act for ascertaining the Duties upon Arrack; and for giving further Time to Clerks and Apprentices to pay Duties omitted to be paid for their Indentures and Contracts. (Repealed by Statute Law Revision Act 1867 (30 & 31 Vict. c. 59))
| Responsibility of Shipowners Act 1733 (repealed) | 7 Geo. 2. c. 15 | 16 April 1734 |
An Act to settle how far Owners of Ships shall be answerable for the Acts of the Masters or Mariners. (Repealed by Merchant Shipping Repeal Act 1854 (17 & 18 Vict. c. 120))
| Parliamentary Elections (Scotland) Act 1733 (repealed) | 7 Geo. 2. c. 16 | 16 April 1734 |
An Act for the better regulating the Election of Members to serve in the House of Commons, for that Part of Great Britain called Scotland; and for incapacitating the Judges of the Court of Session, Court of Justiciary, and Barons of the Court of Exchequer, in Scotland, to be elected, or to sit or vote, as Members of the House of Commons. (Repealed by House of Commons Disqualification Act 1957 (5 & 6 Eliz. 2. c. 20))
| South Sea Company Act 1733 (repealed) | 7 Geo. 2. c. 17 | 16 April 1734 |
An Act to explain an Act passed in the last Session of Parliament, intituled, "An Act for the converting a further Part of the Capital Stock of the South Sea Company into Annuities, redeemable by Parliament; and for settling the remaining Part of the said Stock in the said Company;" (Note: National Debt Act 1732 (6 Geo. 2. c. 28)) so far as the said Act relates to the paying off the Bonds of the said Company. (Repealed by Statute Law Revision Act 1867 (30 & 31 Vict. c. 59))
| Importation Act 1733 (repealed) | 7 Geo. 2. c. 18 | 16 April 1734 |
An Act for the Revival of an Act made in the Thirteenth Year of the Reign of His late Majesty King George the First, intituled, "An Act for the free Importation of Cochineal, during the Time therein limited;" (Note: Importation (No. 2) Act 1726 (13 Geo. 1. c. 25)) and also for the free Importation of Indico. (Repealed by Repeal of Acts Concerning Importation (No. 2) Act 1822 (3 Geo. 4. c. 42))
| Adulteration of Hops Act 1733 (repealed) | 7 Geo. 2. c. 19 | 16 April 1734 |
An Act for the more effectual preventing the clandestine Importation of Foreign Hops into Great Britain and Ireland; and to prevent the adulterating or sophisticating of Hops, to alter the Colour or Scent thereof. (Repealed for England and Wales by Food and Drugs Act 1938 (1 & 2 Geo. 6. c. 56) and for Scotland and Northern Ireland Statute Law Revision Act 1959 (7 & 8 Eliz. 2. c. 68))
| Mortgage Act 1733 (repealed) | 7 Geo. 2. c. 20 | 16 April 1734 |
An Act for the more easy Redemption and Foreclosure of Mortgages. (Repealed by Statute Law Revision Act 1948 (11 & 12 Geo. 6. c. 62))
| Assaults with Intent to Rob Act 1733 (repealed) | 7 Geo. 2. c. 21 | 16 April 1734 |
An Act for the more effectual Punishment of Assaults with Intent to commit Robbery. (Repealed by Benefit of Clergy, etc. (No. 2) Act 1823 (4 Geo. 4. c. 54))
| Forgery Act 1733 (repealed) | 7 Geo. 2. c. 22 | 16 April 1734 |
An Act for the more effectual preventing the forging the Acceptance of Bills of Exchange, or the Numbers or principal Sums of accomptable Receipts for Notes, Bills, or other Securities for Payment of Money, or Warrants or Orders for Payment of Money or Delivery of Goods. (Repealed by Forgery Act 1830 (11 Geo. 4 & 1 Will. 4. c. 66))
| Militia Act 1733 (repealed) | 7 Geo. 2. c. 23 | 16 April 1734 |
An Act for raising the Militia of that Part of Great Britain called England, although the Month's Pay formerly advanced be not re-paid; and for making the Militia within the same more useful. (Repealed by Statute Law Revision Act 1867 (30 & 31 Vict. c. 59))
| Printing of Thuanus' Histories Act 1733 (repealed) | 7 Geo. 2. c. 24 | 16 April 1734 |
An Act for granting to Samuel Buckley, Citizen and Stationer of London, the sole Liberty of printing and re-printing the Histories of Thuanus, with Additions and Improvements, during the Time therein limited. (Repealed by Statute Law Revision Act 1948 (11 & 12 Geo. 6. c. 62))
| Cloth Manufacture Act 1733 (repealed) | 7 Geo. 2. c. 25 | 16 April 1734 |
An Act to explain and amend an Act passed in the Eleventh Year of the Reign of His late Majesty King George the First, intituled, "An Act for the better regulating the Manufacture of Cloth, in the West Riding of the County of York." (Note: Cloth Manufacturer Act 1724 (11 Geo. 1. c. 24)) (Repealed by Cloth Manufacture, Yorkshire Act 1765 (5 Geo. 3. c. 51))
| Middlesex Roads Act 1733 (repealed) | 7 Geo. 2. c. 26 | 16 April 1734 |
An Act for continuing, explaining, and making more effectual, Two Acts of Parliament, one of the Third, (Note: Middlesex and Hertfordshire Roads Act 1716 (3 Geo. 1. c. 4 Pr.)) and the other of the Eighth, (Note: Highgate and Hampstead Highways Act 1721 (8 Geo. 1. c. 5)) Year of the Reign of His late Majesty King George the First, for repairing the Highways from the several Places in the said Acts mentioned, to Highgate Gatehouse and Hampstead, in the County of Middlesex; and for amending the Roads from the South End of the said Town of Hampstead, to the further End of Burrough Lane, in the Parish of Hendon; and for repairing other Roads therein mentioned, lying in the Parish of Islington, in the said County. (Repealed by Highgate and Hampstead Roads Act 1776 (16 Geo. 3. c. 76) and Roads to Highgate House and Hampstead Act 1821 (1 & 2 Geo. 4. c. cx))
| Church at Coventry Act 1733 | 7 Geo. 2. c. 27 | 16 April 1734 |
An Act for making the Church of Bablack, in the City of Coventry, a Parish Church; and for appointing a District or Parish thereto; and for enabling the Master and Usher of the Free Grammar School within the said City to be the Rector and Lecturer of the said Parish Church.
| River Weaver Navigation Act 1733 | 7 Geo. 2. c. 28 | 16 April 1734 |
An Act to extend the Navigation of the River Weaver, from Winsford Bridge, to the Town of Namptwich, in the County of Chester.
| Alconbury Hill and Wandesford Bridge Road Act 1733 (repealed) | 7 Geo. 2. c. 29 | 16 April 1734 |
An Act for making more effectual an Act passed in the Thirteenth Year of the Reign of His late Majesty King George the First, intituled, "An Act for the more effectual amending the Highways leading from Royston, in the County of Hertford, to Wandsford Bridge, in the County of Huntingdon," (Note: Royston and Wandesford Bridge Road Act 1726 (13 Geo. 1. c. 32)) so far as the same relates to the amending that Part of the Road as lies between a Place called The White Post, upon Alconbury Hill, and Wandsford Bridge, in the said County of Huntingdon, called The North Division. (Repealed by Alconbury Hill and Norman Cross Roads (Huntingdonshire) Act 1798 (38 Geo. 3. c. xlviii))

=== Private acts ===
| Short title | Citation | Royal assent |
Long title
| Naturalization of John Mathew Buttner, John Lewis Kraguelius and others. | 7 Geo. 2. c. 1 Pr. | 21 February 1734 |
An Act to naturalize John Matthew Buttner, John Lewis Kraguelius, and others.
| Woolsthorpe Inclosure Act 1733 | 7 Geo. 2. c. 2 Pr. | 21 March 1734 |
An Act for confirming the Enclosure, Division, and Exchanges, of several Lands and Grounds, lying in the Common Fields of Wollesthorpe, near Belvoir Castle, in the County of Lincoln.
| Robert Dalzell (Relief) Act 1733 | 7 Geo. 2. c. 3 Pr. | 21 March 1734 |
An Act to enable Robert Dalzell, late Earl of Carnwath, to sue or maintain any Action or Suit, notwithstanding his Attainder; and to remove any Disability in him, by reason of his said Attainder, to take or inherit any Real or Personal Estate that may or shall hereafter descend or come to him.
| Calverley's Name Act 1733 | 7 Geo. 2. c. 4 Pr. | 21 March 1734 |
An Act to enable Walter Calverley Esquire, now called Walter Blackett Esquire, and his Issue Male, to take and use the Surname of Blackett only, pursuant to the Will of Sir William Blackett Baronet, deceased.
| Strode's Estate Act 1733 | 7 Geo. 2. c. 5 Pr. | 16 April 1734 |
An Act for vesting certain Lands and Tenements, lying contiguous to the Citadel of Plymouth, being the Estate of William Strode, an Infant, in Trustees, in order to sell and convey the same to or for the Use of His Majesty.
| Earl of Burlington's Estate Act 1733 | 7 Geo. 2. c. 6 Pr. | 16 April 1734 |
An Act for supplying an Omission in a former Act of Parliament, (Note: Earl of Burlington's Estate Act 1717 (4 Geo. 1. c. 11 Pr.)) to enable Richard Earl of Burlington to grant Leases of Ground behind Burlington House.
| Marquis of Annandale's Estate Act 1733 | 7 Geo. 2. c. 7 Pr. | 16 April 1734 |
An Act to enable the Trustees and Executors of the last Will and Testament of John Vanden Bempde Esquire, deceased, to lay out Part of the said Testator's Trust Estate in the Purchase of Securities affecting the Marquis of Annandale's Estate in Scotland, and carrying Interest after the Rate of Five Pounds per Centum per Annum, to be assigned to the said Trustees, to and for the same Uses and Trusts as by the said Will are declared of and concerning the said Trust Estate.
| Vesting in Sir Theodore Janssen the remainder in fee simple now vested in the Crown, expectant on the determination of estates tail in the manor and advowson of Ower Moigne (Dorset), and several lands and hereditaments in the same manor. | 7 Geo. 2. c. 8 Pr. | 16 April 1734 |
An Act for vesting in Sir Theodore Janssen Knight and Baronet, and his Heirs, the Remainder in Fee Simple, now in the Crown, expectant on the Determination of certain Estates Tail, of and in the Manor and Advowson of Ower Moigne, in the County of Dorset, and several Lands and Hereditaments to the same Manor belonging.
| Swawen's Estate Act 1733 | 7 Geo. 2. c. 9 Pr. | 16 April 1734 |
An Act for enabling Thomas Scawen Esquire and others to sell an Estate in Ireland, settled by Sir William Scawen's Will; and settling another Estate, purchased by the said Thomas Scawen; in England, of greater Value, to the same Uses.
| Duchess of Hamilton and Brandon's Estate Act 1733 | 7 Geo. 2. c. 10 Pr. | 16 April 1734 |
An Act for the Sale of the Manor of Hopsford, in the County of Warwick, for raising Money, towards discharging the Debts and Incumbrances of Elizabeth late Dutchess of Hamilton and Brandon, deceased.
| Discharge of a ground called The Posthouse Field from certain charitable trusts and settling another on the same trusts. | 7 Geo. 2. c. 11 Pr. | 16 April 1734 |
An Act for discharging a certain Piece of Ground, called The Pesthouse Field, from certain Charitable Trusts; and for settling another Piece of Ground, of equal Extent, and in a more convenient Place, upon the same Trusts.
| Evelyn's Estate Act 1733 | 7 Geo. 2. c. 12 Pr. | 16 April 1734 |
An Act for vesting certain Houses in Blechingly, in the County of Surrey, late the Estate of George Evelyn Esquire, deceased, in Charles Boone Esquire; and for settling another Estate, of greater Value, on the Daughters and Coheirs of the said George Evelyn, in Lieu of, and Exchange for, the same.
| Evelyn's Estate (No. 2) Act 1733 | 7 Geo. 2. c. 13 Pr. | 16 April 1734 |
An Act for vesting Part of the Estate late of George Evelyn Esquire, deceased, in the County of Surrey, in Trustees, in order to sell and convey the same to Charles Boone Esquire, pursuant to an Agreement for that Purpose.
| Trentham Inclosure Act 1733 | 7 Geo. 2. c. 14 Pr. | 16 April 1734 |
An Act for enclosing the Common or Waste called Lightwood Forest, otherwise Cocknage Banks, and Blurton Common, in the Manor and Parish of Trentham, in the County of Stafford.
| Great and Little Cleybrooke (Leicestershire) Inclosure Act 1733 | 7 Geo. 2. c. 15 Pr. | 16 April 1734 |
An Act for confirming and making effectual several Articles of Agreement, made for enclosing and dividing the Common Fields of Great Cleybrooke and Little Cleybrooke, in the County of Leicester.
| Morland's Estate Act 1733 | 7 Geo. 2. c. 16 Pr. | 16 April 1734 |
An Act for confirming a Conveyance of divers Lands and Hereditaments, in the County of Durham, late the Estate of John Morland Esquire, deceased, for Payment of his Debts and Incumbrances.
| Culliford's Estate Act 1733 | 7 Geo. 2. c. 17 Pr. | 16 April 1734 |
An Act for the Sale of the Manor, Farm, and Lands of Encombe, in the County of Dorset, Part of the Estate of John Culliford Esquire, deceased, for Payment of the Debts and Incumbrances charged upon and affecting the same.
| Ashe's Name Act 1733 | 7 Geo. 2. c. 18 Pr. | 16 April 1734 |
An Act to enable Joseph Wyndham Esquire, and his Issue Male, to take and use the Surname of Ashe, pursuant to the last Will and Testament of Dame Mary Ashe.
| Bristowe's Naturalization Act 1733 | 7 Geo. 2. c. 19 Pr. | 16 April 1734 |
An Act to naturalize Anne Judith Bristowe, Wife of John Bristowe Esquire.
| Bull's Naturalization Act 1733 | 7 Geo. 2. c. 20 Pr. | 16 April 1734 |
An Act to naturalize Bartold Bull.

=== Sources ===
- Pickering, Danby, ed. (1765). The Statutes at Large. Vol. 16: From the Second to the 9th Year of King George II. Cambridge: Joseph Bentham – via Internet Archive.
- Pickering, Danby, ed. (1765). The Statutes at Large. Vol. 16: From the Second to the 9th Year of King George II. Cambridge: Joseph Bentham – via Google Books.
- Journals of the House of Commons. Vol. 22. London: His Majesty's Stationery Office. 1803. pp. 205–316 – via Google Books.
- Chronological Table of and Index to the Statutes. Vol. 1: To the End of the Session 59 Vict. Sess. 2 (1895) (13th ed.). London: Her Majesty's Stationery Office. 1896. pp. 102–103 – via Google Books.

== See also ==
- List of acts of the Parliament of Great Britain
