= Revenue Act 1766 =

Act of the Parliament of Great Britain

Customs, etc. Act 1766
- Act of Parliament
- Parliament of Great Britain
- Long title: An act for repealing certain duties, in the British colonies and plantations, granted by several acts of parliament; and also the duties imposed by an act made in the last session of parliament upon certain East India goods exported from Great Britain; and for granting other duties instead thereof; and for further encouraging, regulating, and securing, several branches of the trade of this kingdom, and the British dominions in America.
- Citation: 6 Geo. 3. c. 52
- Territorial extent: Great Britain

Dates
- Royal assent: 6 June 1766
- Commencement: 17 December 1765 (Note: Start of session.)
- Repealed: 15 July 1867
Other legislation
Amended by	Repeal of Acts Concerning Importation (No. 2) Act 1822; Customs (Repeal) Act 1833
Repealed by	Statute Law Revision Act 1867
Relates to	Free Port Act 1766

Status: Repealed

Text of statute as originally enacted

The Revenue Act 1766 (6 Geo. 3. c. 52), also known as the Customs Act 1766, was an act of the Parliament of Great Britain passed in response to objections raised to the Sugar Act 1764. The act was passed in conjunction with the Free Port Act 1766 (6 Geo. 3. c. 49).

== Subsequent developments ==
The whole act was repealed by section 1 of, and the schedule to, the Statute Law Revision Act 1867 (30 & 31 Vict. c. 59), which came into force on 15 July 1867.
