= List of acts of the Parliament of Great Britain from 1766 =

This is a complete list of acts of the Parliament of Great Britain for the year 1766.

For acts passed until 1707, see the list of acts of the Parliament of England and the list of acts of the Parliament of Scotland. See also the list of acts of the Parliament of Ireland.

For acts passed from 1801 onwards, see the list of acts of the Parliament of the United Kingdom. For acts of the devolved parliaments and assemblies in the United Kingdom, see the list of acts of the Scottish Parliament, the list of acts of the Northern Ireland Assembly, and the list of acts and measures of Senedd Cymru; see also the list of acts of the Parliament of Northern Ireland.

The number shown after each act's title is its chapter number. Acts are cited using this number, preceded by the year(s) of the reign during which the relevant parliamentary session was held; thus the Union with Ireland Act 1800 is cited as "39 & 40 Geo. 3. c. 67", meaning the 67th act passed during the session that started in the 39th year of the reign of George III and which finished in the 40th year of that reign. Note that the modern convention is to use Arabic numerals in citations (thus "41 Geo. 3" rather than "41 Geo. III"). Acts of the last session of the Parliament of Great Britain and the first session of the Parliament of the United Kingdom are both cited as "41 Geo. 3".

Acts passed by the Parliament of Great Britain did not have a short title; however, some of these acts have subsequently been given a short title by acts of the Parliament of the United Kingdom (such as the Short Titles Act 1896).

Before the Acts of Parliament (Commencement) Act 1793 came into force on 8 April 1793, acts passed by the Parliament of Great Britain were deemed to have come into effect on the first day of the session in which they were passed. Because of this, the years given in the list below may in fact be the year before a particular act was passed.

== 6 Geo. 3 ==
The fifth session of the 12th Parliament of Great Britain, which met from 17 December 1765 until 6 June 1766.

This session was also traditionally cited as 6 G. 3.

=== Public acts ===
Short title	Citation	Royal assent
Long title
Importation Act 1766 (repealed)	6 Geo. 3. c. 1	19 February 1766
An Act to continue an Act made in the last Session of Parliament, intituled, "An Act for Importation of Salted Beef, Pork, Bacon, and Butter, from Ireland, for a limited Time." (Note: Importation Act 1765 (5 Geo. 3. c. 1)) (Repealed by Statute Law Revision Act 1867 (30 & 31 Vict. c. 59))
Malt Duties Act 1766 (repealed)	6 Geo. 3. c. 2	19 February 1766
An Act for continuing, and granting to His Majesty, certain Duties upon Malt, Mum, Cyder, and Perry, for the Service of the Year One Thousand Seven Hundred and Sixty-six. (Repealed by Statute Law Revision Act 1867 (30 & 31 Vict. c. 59))
Importation and Exportation Act 1766 (repealed)	6 Geo. 3. c. 3	19 February 1766
An Act for allowing the Importation of Corn and Grain from His Majesty's Colonies in America into this Kingdom, for a limited Time, free of Duty. (Repealed by Statute Law Revision Act 1867 (30 & 31 Vict. c. 59))
Importation and Exportation (No. 2) Act 1766 (repealed)	6 Geo. 3. c. 4	19 February 1766
An Act for allowing the Importation of Oats and Oatmeal into this Kingdom, for a limited Time, Duty-free. (Repealed by Statute Law Revision Act 1867 (30 & 31 Vict. c. 59))
Importation and Exportation (No. 3) Act 1766 (repealed)	6 Geo. 3. c. 5	19 February 1766
An Act to prohibit the Exportation of Com, Grain, Malt, Meal, Flour, Bread, Biscuit, and Starch, for a limited Time. (Repealed by Statute Law Revision Act 1867 (30 & 31 Vict. c. 59))
Small Debts, Kent, etc. Act 1766 (repealed)	6 Geo. 3. c. 6	19 February 1766
An Act for extending the Provisions of an Act made in the last Session of Parliament, (Note: Small Debts, Blackheath, etc. Act 1765 (5 Geo. 3. c. 8)) for the more easy and speedy Recovery of small Debts, within the Hundreds of Blackheath, of Bromley and Beckenham of Rokesley otherwise Ruxley and of Little and Lessness in the County of Kent, to the Hundred of Wallington in the County of Surrey. (Repealed by Surrey and Kent Courts of Request Act 1836 (6 & 7 Will. 4. c. cxx))
Indemnity Act 1766 (repealed)	6 Geo. 3. c. 7	18 March 1766
An Act to indemnify such Persons as have omitted to qualify themselves for Offices and Employments, and to indemnify Justices of the Peace, Deputy Lieutenants, and Officers of the Militia, or others, who have omitted to register or deliver in their Qualifications within the Time limited by Law; and for giving further Time for those Purposes; and to indemnify Members and Officers, in Cities, Corporations, and Borough Towns, whose Admissions have been omitted to be stamped according to the several Acts of Parliament now in Force for that Purpose, or, having been stamped, have been lost or mislaid; and for allowing them Time to provide Admissions duly stamped. (Repealed by Statute Law Revision Act 1867 (30 & 31 Vict. c. 59))
Mutiny Act 1766 (repealed)	6 Geo. 3. c. 8	18 March 1766
An Act for punishing Mutiny and Desertion; and for the better Payment of the Army and their Quarters. (Repealed by Statute Law Revision Act 1867 (30 & 31 Vict. c. 59))
Land Tax Act 1766 (repealed)	6 Geo. 3. c. 9	18 March 1766
An Act for granting an Aid to His Majesty, by a Land Tax to be raised in Great Britain, for the Service of the Year One Thousand Seven Hundred and Sixty-Six. (Repealed by Statute Law Revision Act 1867 (30 & 31 Vict. c. 59))
Marine Mutiny Act 1766 (repealed)	6 Geo. 3. c. 10	18 March 1766
An Act for the Regulation of His Majesty's Marine Forces while on Shore. (Repealed by Statute Law Revision Act 1867 (30 & 31 Vict. c. 59))
Duties in American Colonies Act 1766 or the Repeal Act (Note: Referred to as the 'Repeal Act' as it repealed the Stamp Act 1765.) (repealed)	6 Geo. 3. c. 11	18 March 1766
An Act to repeal an Act, made in the last Session of Parliament, intituled, "An Act for granting and applying certain Stamp Duties, and other Duties, in the British Colonies and Plantations in America, towards further defraying the Expenses of defending, protecting, and securing, the same; and for amending such Parts of the several Acts of Parliament, relating to the Trade and Revenues of the said Colonies and Plantations, as direct the Manner of determining and recovering the Penalties and Forfeitures there in mentioned." (Note: Duties in American Colonies Act 1765 (5 Geo. 3. c. 12)) (Repealed by Statute Law Revision Act 1867 (30 & 31 Vict. c. 59))
American Colonies Act 1766 or the Declaratory Act (repealed)	6 Geo. 3. c. 12	18 March 1766
An Act for the better Securing the Dependency of His Majesty’s Dominions in America upon the Crown and Parliament of Great Britain. (Repealed by Statute Law Revision Act 1964 (c. 79))
Importation (No. 2) Act 1766 (repealed)	6 Geo. 3. c. 13	18 March 1766
An Act to remove a Doubt concerning such Part of an Act, made in the last Session of Parliament, (Note: Customs, etc., Revenues Act 1765 (5 Geo. 3. c. 43)) as relates to the ascertaining of the Duties upon the Importation of certain Linen Cloth of the Manufacture of Russia; and to obviate all Doubts with respect to the Importation of Tea, under certain Licenses, authorized to be granted by an Act made in the Eighteenth Year of the Reign of His late Majesty. (Note: Inland Duties, etc. Act 1744 (18 Geo. 2. c. 26)) (Repealed by Statute Law Revision Act 1867 (30 & 31 Vict. c. 59))
Duties on Cider, etc. Act 1766 (repealed)	6 Geo. 3. c. 14	11 April 1766
An Act for repealing the Duties granted upon Cyder and Perry by an Act made in the Third Year of His present Majesty's Reign; (Note: National Debt (No. 2) Act 1762 (3 Geo. 3. c. 12)) and for granting other Duties on Cyder and Perry in Lieu thereof; and for more effectually securing the Duties on Cyder and Perry imposed by several former Acts. (Repealed by Statute Law Revision Act 1867 (30 & 31 Vict. c. 59))
Unfunded Debt Act 1766 (repealed)	6 Geo. 3. c. 15	11 April 1766
An Act for raising a certain Sum of Money, by Loans or Exchequer Bills, for the Service of the Year One Thousand Seven Hundred and Sixty-six. (Repealed by Statute Law Revision Act 1867 (30 & 31 Vict. c. 59))
Small Debts (Bath) Act 1766 (repealed)	6 Geo. 3. c. 16	30 April 1766
An Act for the more easy and speedy Recovery of small Debts within the City of Bath and the Liberties and Precincts thereof. (Repealed by Bath Court of Requests Act 1805 (45 Geo. 3. c. lxvii) and County Courts Act 1846 (9 & 10 Vict. c. 95))
Corn Act 1766 (repealed)	6 Geo. 3. c. 17	30 April 1766
An Act for explaining and amending so much of an Act, made in the First Year of the Reign of King James the Second, intituled, "An additional Act for the Improvement of Tillage," (Note: Tillage Act 1685 (1 Jas. 2. c. 19)) as relates to the City of London. (Repealed by Statute Law Revision Act 1867 (30 & 31 Vict. c. 59))
Mutiny in America Act 1766 (repealed)	6 Geo. 3. c. 18	30 April 1766
An Act to amend and render more effectual, in His Majesty's Dominions in America, an Act passed in this present Session of Parliament, intituled, "An Act for punishing Mutiny and Desertion, and for the better Payment of the Army and their Quarters." (Note: Mutiny Act 1766 (6 Geo. 3. c. 8)) (Repealed by Statute Law Revision Act 1867 (30 & 31 Vict. c. 59))
Importation (No. 3) Act 1766 (repealed)	6 Geo. 3. c. 19	30 April 1766
An Act for the more effectual Encouragement of the Trade and Manufacture of Leather Gloves and Mitts in this Kingdom. (Repealed by Customs Law Repeal Act 1825 (6 Geo. 4. c. 105))
Small Debts (Derby) Act 1766 (repealed)	6 Geo. 3. c. 20	30 April 1766
An Act for the more easy and speedy Recovery of small Debts within the Borough of Derby and the Liberties thereof. (Repealed by County Courts Act 1846 (9 & 10 Vict. c. 95))
National Debt Act 1766 (repealed)	6 Geo. 3. c. 21	14 May 1766
An Act for redeeming One Third Part of the Remainder of the Joint Stock of Annuities established by an Act made in the Third Year of His present Majesty's Reign, (Note: National Debt Act 1762 (3 Geo. 3. c. 9)) in respect of several Navy, Victualling, and Transport Bills; and Ordnance Debentures. (Repealed by Statute Law Revision Act 1870 (33 & 34 Vict. c. 69))
Coal Loading (Newcastle and Sunderland) Act 1766	6 Geo. 3. c. 22	14 May 1766
An Act to regulate the Loading of Ships with Coals in the Ports of Newcastle and Sunderland.
Cloth Manufacture, Yorkshire Act 1766 (repealed)	6 Geo. 3. c. 23	14 May 1766
An Act to amend an Act made in the last Session of Parliament, intituled, "An Act for repealing several Laws relating to the Manufacture of Woollen Cloth in the County of York, and also so much of several other Laws as prescribes particular Standards of Width and Length of such Woollen Cloths; and for substituting other Regulations of the Cloth Trade within the West Riding of the said County; for preventing Frauds in certifying the Contents of the Cloth; and for preserving the Credit of the said Manufacture at the Foreign Market." (Note: Cloth Manufacture, Yorkshire Act 1765 (5 Geo. 3. c. 51)) (Repealed by Master and Servant Act 1889 (52 & 53 Vict. c. 24))
Southwark Improvement Act 1766 (repealed)	6 Geo. 3. c. 24	14 May 1766
An Act for paving the Streets and Lanes within the Town and Borough of Southwark, and certain Parts adjacent, in the County of Surrey; and for cleansing, lighting, and watching, the same, and also the Courts, Yards, Alleys, and Passages, adjoining thereto; and for preventing Annoyances therein. (Repealed by Southwark Improvement Act 1845 (8 & 9 Vict. c. xiii), London Government (Borough of Bermondsey) Order in Council 1901 (SR&O 1901/264) and London Government (Borough of Southwark) Order in Council 1901 (SR&O 1901/275))
Regulation of Apprentices Act 1766 (repealed)	6 Geo. 3. c. 25	14 May 1766
An Act for better regulating Apprentices, and Persons working under Contract. (Repealed by Conspiracy and Protection of Property Act 1875 (38 & 39 Vict. c. 86))
London Paving and Lighting Act 1766 (repealed)	6 Geo. 3. c. 26	14 May 1766
An Act for the better paving, cleansing, and enlightening, the City of London and the Liberties thereof; and for preventing Obstructions Annoyances within the same; and for other Purposes therein mentioned. (Repealed by Paving, etc., of London Act 1768 (8 Geo. 3. c. 21) and City of London Sewerage Act 1771 (11 Geo. 3. c. 29))
London Widening of Passages, etc. Act 1766	6 Geo. 3. c. 27	14 May 1766
An Act to explain, amend, and render more effectual, the Powers of an Act made in the Thirty-third Year of the Reign of His late Majesty, intituled, "An Act for widening certain Streets, Lanes, and Passages, within the City of London and Liberties thereof; and for opening certain new Streets and Ways within the same; and for other Purposes therein mentioned." (Note: London Streets, City Act 1759 (33 Geo. 2. c. 30))
Importation, etc. Act 1766 (repealed)	6 Geo. 3. c. 28	14 May 1766
An Act to prohibit the Importation of Foreign Wrought Silks and Velvets, for a limited Time; and for preventing unlawful Combinations of Workmen employed in the Silk Manufacture. (Repealed by Criminal Law Act 1782 (22 Geo. 3. c. 40) and Customs Law Repeal Act 1825 (6 Geo. 4. c. 105))
Frame Work Knitters Act 1766 (repealed)	6 Geo. 3. c. 29	14 May 1766
An Act to prevent the fraudulent Marking of Frame-work Knitted Pieces and Stockings. (Repealed by Statute Law Revision Act 1867 (30 & 31 Vict. c. 59))
Militia Pay, etc. Act 1766 (repealed)	6 Geo. 3. c. 30	14 May 1766
An Act for applying the Money granted in this Session of Parliament, for defraying the Charge of the Pay and Cloathing of the Militia of that Part of Great Britain called England, for One Year, beginning the Twenty-fifth Day of March, One Thousand Seven Hundred and Sixty-six; and for explaining, amending, and rendering more effectual, several Acts of Parliament, passed in the Second, (Note: Militia Act 1762 (2 Geo. 3. c. 20)) Fourth, (Note: Militia Act 1763 (4 Geo. 3. c. 17)) and Fifth (Note: Militia Act 1765 (5 Geo. 3. c. 36)) Years of the Reign of His present Majesty, relating to the raising and training the Militia within that Part of Great Britain called England. (Repealed by Statute Law Revision Act 1867 (30 & 31 Vict. c. 59))
Spurn Point Lighthouse Act 1766 (repealed)	6 Geo. 3. c. 31	14 May 1766
An Act for taking down and removing certain Light-houses now standing near The Spurn Point, at the Mouth of The Humber; and for erecting other fit and convenient Light-houses instead thereof. (Repealed by Statute Law Revision Act 1867 (30 & 31 Vict. c. 59))
Transportation (Scotland) Act 1766 (repealed)	6 Geo. 3. c. 32	14 May 1766
An Act to extend an Act made in the Fourth Year of the Reign of King George the First, intituled, "An Act for the further preventing Robbery, Burglary, and other Felonies; and for the more effectual Transportation of Felons and unlawful Exporters of Wool; and for declaring the Law upon some Points relative to Pirates," (Note: Piracy Act 1717 (4 Geo. 1. c. 11)) to that Part of Great Britain called Scotland, so far as the said Act relates to the more effectual Transportation of Felons; and for amending and rendering more effectual the Laws for restraining Muirburn in forbidden Time, in that Part of the United Kingdom. (Repealed by Statute Law Revision Act 1871 (34 & 35 Vict. c. 116))
Exchange of Crown Lands in Perthshire Act 1766 (repealed)	6 Geo. 3. c. 33	14 May 1766
An Act to enable His Majesty to exchange the Lands of Fernan and Lix, in the County of Perth, for other Lands, belonging to the Right Honourable John Earl of Breadalbane, in Pitkellony, in the said County of Perth. (Repealed by Statute Law Revision Act 1948 (11 & 12 Geo. 6. c. 62))
Bristol Streets Act 1766 or the Bristol Improvement Act 1766	6 Geo. 3. c. 34	14 May 1766
An Act for widening several Streets, Lanes, Ways, and Passages, within the City of Bristol, and for opening several new Streets and Passages within the same; and for explaining, amending, and enlarging, the Powers of the several Acts passed for paving, cleansing, lighting, watching, and regulating, the Streets and other Places within the said City and Liberties thereof.
Coal Trade (Westminster) Act 1766 (repealed)	6 Geo. 3. c. 35	6 June 1766
An Act to continue an Act made in the Thirty-second Year of His late Majesty's King George the Second, (Note: Coal Trade (London) Act 1758 (32 Geo. 2. c. 27)) for continuing, amending, explaining, and making more effectual, an Act made in the Nineteenth Year of His Said Majesty, (Note: Coal Trade (London) Act 1745 (19 Geo. 2. c. 35)) more effectually to prevent the Frauds and Abuses committed in the Admeasurement of Coals within the City and Liberty of Westminster, and other Places therein mentioned. (Repealed by Westminster Coal Trade Act 1786 (26 Geo. 3. c. 108))
Cultivation, etc., of Trees Act 1766 (repealed)	6 Geo. 3. c. 36	6 June 1766
An Act for encouraging the Cultivation, and for the better Preservation, of Trees, Roots, Plants, and Shrubs. (Repealed by Statute Law Revision Act 1867 (30 & 31 Vict. c. 59))
Regulation of Buildings Act 1766 (repealed)	6 Geo. 3. c. 37	6 June 1766
An Act to explain, amend, and render more effectual, an Act made in the Fourth Year of His present Majesty's Reign, (Note: Regulation of Buildings Act 1763 (4 Geo. 3. c. 14)) for the better regulating of Buildings; and to prevent Mischiefs that may happen by Fire within the Weekly Bills of Mortality and other Places therein mentioned. (Repealed by Statute Law Revision Act 1867 (30 & 31 Vict. c. 59))
House and Window Duties Act 1766 (repealed)	6 Geo. 3. c. 38	6 June 1766
An Act for repealing the several Duties upon Houses, Windows, and Lights; and for granting to His Majesty other Duties upon Houses, Windows, and Lights. (Repealed by House Tax Act 1803 (43 Geo. 3. c. 161))
National Debt (No. 2) Act 1766 (repealed)	6 Geo. 3. c. 39	6 June 1766
An Act for raising the Sum of One Million Five Hundred Thousand Pounds, by Way of Annuities and a Lottery, to be charged on the Sinking Fund. (Repealed by Statute Law Revision Act 1870 (33 & 34 Vict. c. 69))
Stamps Act 1766 (repealed)	6 Geo. 3. c. 40	6 June 1766
An Act for explaining and amending much Part of an Act, made in the Third Year of the Reign of His present Majesty, as relates to certain Duties on Wines imported; for the more easy collecting and effectually securing the Stamp Duties for Copies of Court Rolls, for Relief of Persons who have omitted to insert in Indentures, or other Writings, the full Sum agreed to be paid with Clerks, Apprentices, and other Servants; for amending such Parts of Two Acts made in the last Session of Parliament, (Note: Stamp (No. 1) Act 1765 (5 Geo. 3. c. 35)) (Note: Customs, etc. (No. 2) Act 1765 (5 Geo. 3. c. 30)) as relate to certain East India Goods and Bugles exported to Africa; for permitting a certain Quantity of Wheat, Barley, Oats, Meal, and Flour, to be exported from Great Britain to the Isle of Man for the Use of the Inhabitants there; for allowing the Exportation of certain Quantities of Coals, free from the Payment of the Duty granted by an Act made in the last Session of Parliament, to the Islands of Jersey, Guernsey, and Alderney; and for obviating certain Doubts with respect to the Importation of Oats and Oat-meal under the Authority of an Act made in this present Session of Parliament. (Note: Importation and Exportation (No. 2) Act 1766 (6 Geo. 3. c. 4)) (Repealed by Inland Revenue Repeal Act 1870 (33 & 34 Vict. c. 99))
Supply, etc. Act 1766 (repealed)	6 Geo. 3. c. 41	6 June 1766
An Act for granting to His Majesty a certain Sum of Money, out of the Sinking Fund; and for applying certain Monies, therein mentioned, for the Service of the Year One Thousand Seven Hundred and Sixty fix; and for further appropriating the Supplies granted in this Session of Parliament. (Repealed by Statute Law Revision Act 1867 (30 & 31 Vict. c. 59))
Importation into Quebec Act 1766 (repealed)	6 Geo. 3. c. 42	6 June 1766
An Act to continue an Act made in the Fourth Year of the Reign of His present Majesty, (Note: Importation into Quebec Act 1763 (4 Geo. 3. c. 19)) for importing Salt from Europe into the Province of Quebec in America, for a limited Time. (Repealed by Statute Law Revision Act 1867 (30 & 31 Vict. c. 59))
Highways Act 1766 (repealed)	6 Geo. 3. c. 43	6 June 1766
An Act for explaining, amending, and further enforcing, the Execution or Two several Acts; one made in the Twenty-sixth Year of His late Majesty; (Note: Highways and Turnpike Roads Act 1753 (26 Geo. 2. c. 30)) and the other, in the Fifth Year of His present Majesty's Reign, (Note: Highways Act 1765 (5 Geo. 3. c. 38)) for the Amendment and Preservation of the public Highways and Turnpike Roads of this Kingdom; and for obliging Mortgagees taking Possession of Toll-gates on Turnpike Roads, and Toll, gatherers appointed by them, to accompt. (Repealed by Turnpike Roads Act 1766 (7 Geo. 3. c. 40))
Continuance of Laws Act 1766 (repealed)	6 Geo. 3. c. 44	6 June 1766
An Act to continue several Laws therein mentioned, relating to the allowing a Drawback of the Duties upon the Exportation of Copper Bars imported; to the Encouragement of the Silk Manufactures, and for taking off several Duties on Merchandize exported, and reducing other Duties; to the Premium upon Masts, Yards, and Bowsprits, Tar, Pitch, and Turpentine; to the encouraging Growth of Coffee in His Majesty's Plantations in America; to the securing the Duties on Foreign-made Sail Cloth, and charging Foreign-made Sails with a Duty; and for enlarging the Times limited for executing and performing several Provisions, Powers, and Directions, in Acts of this Session of Parliament. (Repealed by Statute Law Revision Act 1867 (30 & 31 Vict. c. 59))
Bounty of Exportation Act 1766 (repealed)	6 Geo. 3. c. 45	6 June 1766
An Act for allowing a Bounty on the Exportation of British-made Cordage, and for discontinuing the Drawbacks upon Foreign rough Hemp exported. (Repealed by Statute Law Revision Act 1867 (30 & 31 Vict. c. 59))
Customs, etc. (No. 1) Act 1766 (repealed)	6 Geo. 3. c. 46	6 June 1766
An Act for explaining Part of an Act made in the Second Year of the Reign of His present Majesty, (Note: Taxation, etc. Act 1761 (2 Geo. 3. c. 5)) relating to the Removal for Home Consumption of Spirits made for Exportation; for laying an additional Duty upon the Importation of, Silk Crapes and Tiffanies; for allowing the Exportation of a certain Quantity of Gum Senegal and Gum Arabic to Ireland, free of Duty, for the Use of the Manufacturers there; for permitting the Importation into this Kingdom, from the Isle of Man of a certain Quantity of Bugles; and for altering certain Regulations relating to the Tonnage of Ships exporting and importing Spirits. (Repealed by Statute Law Revision Act 1867 (30 & 31 Vict. c. 59))
Customs, etc. (No. 2) Act 1766 (repealed)	6 Geo. 3. c. 47	6 June 1766
An Act for laying additional Duties on certain Spirits imported; and for prolonging the Time allowed by Law for lodging and keeping in Warehouses Rum and Spirits imported. (Repealed by Statute Law Revision Act 1867 (30 & 31 Vict. c. 59))
Preservation of Timber Trees Act 1766 (repealed)	6 Geo. 3. c. 48	6 June 1766
An Act for the better Preservation of Timber Trees, and of Woods and Underwoods; and for the further Preservation of Roots, Shrubs, and Plants. (Repealed by Statute Law Revision Act 1867 (30 & 31 Vict. c. 59))
Free Ports, West Indies, etc. Act 1766 or the Free Port Act 1766 (repealed)	6 Geo. 3. c. 49	6 June 1766
An Act for opening and establishing certain Ports in the Islands of Jamaica and Dominica, for the more free Importation and Exportation of certain Goods and Merchandizes; for granting certain Duties, to defray the Expenses of opening, maintaining, securing, and improving, much Ports; for ascertaining the Duties to be paid upon the Importation of Goods from the Said Island of Dominica into this Kingdom; and for securing the Duties upon Goods imported from the Said Island into any other British Colony. (Repealed by Statute Law Revision Act 1867 (30 & 31 Vict. c. 59))
Customs Act 1766 (repealed)	6 Geo. 3. c. 50	6 June 1766
An Act for allowing the Conveyance from the Ports of Southampton and Portsmouth, to the Port of Cowes in the Isle of Wight, of Goods not liable to Duty on Exportation, or prohibited to be exported; and of Sheep and Cattle between the Said Ports, without Cocquets being taken, or Bonds entered into for that Purpose; and for extending an Act made in the Twenty-ninth Year of the Reign of King Charles the Second, (Note: Affidavits Act 1677 (29 Cha. 2. c. 5)) for taking Affidavits in the Country, to be made Use of in the Courts of King's Bench, Common Pleas, and Exchequer, to the Isle of Man; and for appointing Ports and Places for shipping and landing Goods in the Said Island. (Repealed by Statute Law Revision Act 1867 (30 & 31 Vict. c. 59))
Indemnity (No. 2) Act 1766 (repealed)	6 Geo. 3. c. 51	6 June 1766
An Act for indemnifying Persons who have incurred certain Penalties inflicted by an Act of the last Session of Parliament, for granting certain Stamp Duties in the British Colonies and Plantations in America; and for making valid all Instrument executed or enroled there on unstamped Paper, Vellum, or Parchment. (Repealed by Statute Law Revision Act 1867 (30 & 31 Vict. c. 59))
Customs, etc. Act 1766 or the Revenue Act 1766 (repealed)	6 Geo. 3. c. 52	6 June 1766
An Act for repealing certain Duties, in the British Colonies and Plantations, granted by several Acts of Parliament; and also the Duties imposed by an Act also made in the last Session of Parliament upon certain East India Goods exported from Great Britain; and for granting other Duties instead thereof; and for further encouraging, regulating, and securing, several Branches of the Trade of this Kingdom, and the British Dominions in America. (Repealed by Statute Law Revision Act 1867 (30 & 31 Vict. c. 59))
Treason Act 1766 (repealed)	6 Geo. 3. c. 53	6 June 1766
An Act for altering the Oath of Abjuration and the Assurance; and for amending so much of an Act of the Seventh Year of Her late Majesty Queen Anne, intituled, "An Act for the Improvement of the Union of the Two Kingdoms," (Note: Treason Act 1708 (7 Ann. c. 21)) as, after the Time therein limited, requires the Delivery of certain Lists and Copies therein mentioned to Prisoners indicted of High Treason or Misprision of Treason. (Repealed by Treason Act 1945 (8 & 9 Geo. 6. c. 44))
Streets (London) Act 1766 (repealed)	6 Geo. 3. c. 54	6 June 1766
An Act for putting the Road from Clarges Street to Hyde Park Corner, and from the South End of Park Lane to the North Side of Hertford Street, in the Parish of Saint George Hanover Square, in the County of Middlesex, now under the Direction of the Acts for repairing the Roads in the Parishes of Kensington, Chelsea, Fulham, and Saint George Hanover Square, in the County of Middlesex, under the Management of the Commissioners for paving, cleaning, and lighting, the Squares, Streets, Lanes, and other Places, in Westminster. (Repealed by St. George Hanover Square Improvement Act 1813 (53 Geo. 3. c. xxxviii) and Westminster Improvement Act 1819 (59 Geo. 3. c. xxiii))
Carmarthen Canal Act 1766	6 Geo. 3. c. 55	19 February 1766
An Act to enable Thomas Kymer Esquire to make a Navigable Cut, or Canal, from Little Gwendraeth River, near the Town of Kidwely, to the Great Forest and Pwll Llygod in the County of Carmarthen.
Kent and Sussex Roads Act 1766 (repealed)	6 Geo. 3. c. 56	19 February 1766
An Act for repairing, widening, and keeping in Repair, the Road leading from Tunbridge Wells in the County of Kent, to the Cross Ways near Maresfield Street in the County of Sussex. (Repealed by Roads from Tunbridge Wells and from Florence Farm Act 1831 (1 Will. 4. c. lxx))
Wilts Roads Act 1766	6 Geo. 3. c. 57	18 March 1766
An Act for enlarging the Terms and Powers of Two Acts, One of the Twelfth of King George the First, (Note: Wiltshire Roads (No. 2) Act 1725 (12 Geo. 1. c. 11)) and the other of the Fourteenth of His late Majesty, (Note: Wiltshire Roads Act 1740 (14 Geo. 2. c. 29)) for repairing the Road from Horsley Upright Gate to the Top of Kingsdown Hill, in the County of Wilts; and for amending several Roads near or adjoining to the said Road.
Godstone to Highgate Road Act 1766 (repealed)	6 Geo. 3. c. 58	18 March 1766
An Act for enlarging the Term and Powers of an Act of the Fourth Year of His late Majesty, (Note: Surrey and Sussex Roads Act 1730 (4 Geo. 2. c. 8)) for repairing the Road from Godstone in the County of Surrey, to Highgate in the Parish of East Grinstead, in the County of Sussex. (Repealed by Road from Godstone to Highgate (Sussex) Act 1828 (9 Geo. 4. c. cx))
Beverley and Kendell House, and Molescroft and Bainton Balk Roads Act 1766 (repealed)	6 Geo. 3. c. 59	18 March 1766
An Act for repairing and widening the Road from Beverley by Molscroft to Kendell-house, and from Molscroft to Bainion Balk, in the County of York. (Repealed by Beverley and Kendell House, and Molescroft and Bainton Balk Roads Act 1830 (11 Geo. 4 & 1 Will. 4. c. cxxxi))
Stafford Roads Act 1766	6 Geo. 3. c. 60	11 April 1766
An Act for discontinuing the Use of several Roads leading into and over Fisherwick Park, in the County of Stafford; and for building and maintaining a publick Bridge, cross the River Tame, at or near Elford Mill Ford, in the said County; and for repairing and keeping in Repair the Road from such Bridge to Hademore Gate, in the Road leading through Whiltington to Litchfield.
Port of Liverpool Act 1766 (repealed)	6 Geo. 3. c. 61	18 March 1766
An Act for the better Regulation of Pilots, for the conducting of Ships and Vessels into and out of the Port of Liverpoole. (Repealed by Pilots Liverpool Act 1797 (37 Geo. 3. c. 78))
Yorks Roads (No. 2) Act 1766 (repealed)	6 Geo. 3. c. 62	11 April 1766
An Act to enlarge and continue the Term and Powers granted by an Act, passed in the Fourteenth Year of the Reign of His late Majesty King George the Second, intituled, "An Act for repairing the Roads from Doncaster, through Ferry-bridge, to the South Side of Tadcaster Cross; and also from Ferry-bridge to Weatherby, and from thence to Boroughbridge, in the County of York;" (Note: Doncaster and Tadcaster Road Act 1740 (14 Geo. 2. c. 28)) as to so much of the said Act as relates to the said Roads from Doncaster, through Ferry-bridge, to the South Side of Tadcaster Cross. (Repealed by Road from Doncaster to Tadcaster Cross Act 1831 (1 & 2 Will. 4. c. xv))
Folkestone Parish Church Act 1766	6 Geo. 3. c. 63	11 April 1766
An Act for the Support and Preservation of the Parish Church of Folkestone, and the lower Part of the Town of Folkestone, in the County of Kent.
St. Botolph, Aldgate (Poor Relief) Act 1766 (repealed)	c. 64	11 April 176
An Act for the better maintaining, regulating, and employing, the Poor within the Parish of Saint Botolph Aldgate, in the City of London. (Repealed by Statute Law (Repeals) Act 2013 (c. 2))
Sussex Roads Act 1766 (repealed)	6 Geo. 3. c. 65	11 April 1766
An Act to enlarge the Term and Powers of an Act, made in the Twenty-fifth Year of King George the Second, (Note: Sussex Roads Act 1751 (25 Geo. 2. c. 50)) for repairing the Roads from the North End of Malling Street near the Town of Lewes, and other Roads in the County of Sussex; and for amending the Road from The Broil Park Gate to the West End of the Turnpike Road leading from the Turnpike Road on Hurst Green, through the Parishes of Etchingham and Burwash, and from the said Brod Park Gate to the Town of Battell, in the said County. (Repealed by Lewes Roads Act 1821 (1 & 2 Geo. 4. c. xiv) and Road from Broil Park to Battle Act 1821 (1 & 2 Geo. 4. c. xxvii))
Battersea Bridge Act 1766 (repealed)	6 Geo. 3. c. 66	11 April 1766
An Act for building a Bridge cross the River Thames, from Battersea in the County of Surrey, to Chelsea in the County of Middlesex. (Repealed by Statute Law Revision Act 1948 (11 & 12 Geo. 6. c. 62))
Bawtry to Markham Road Act 1766 (repealed)	6 Geo. 3. c. 67	11 April 1766
An Act for repairing and widening the Road from Bawtry in the County of York, to East Markham Common in the County of Nottingham and from Little Drayton to Twiford Bridge in the said County. (Repealed by Road from Bawtry and from Little Drayton Act 1813 (53 Geo. 3. c. xi) and Annual Turnpike Acts Continuance Act 1872 (35 & 36 Vict. c. 85))
Wimbourne Minster and Blandford Forum Road Act 1766 (repealed)	6 Geo. 3. c. 68	11 April 1766
An Act for repairing and widening the Road from the Cross or Market Place in the Town of Wimborne Minster, to the Cross or Market Place in the Town of Blandford Forum, in the County of Dorset. (Repealed by Wimborne Minster and Blandford Forum Road Act 1831 (1 Will. 4. c. ix))
Cromford Bridge to Langley Mill Road Act 1766 (repealed)	6 Geo. 3. c. 69	30 April 1766
An Act for repairing, widening, and keeping in Repair, the Road leading from Cromford Bridge in the County of Derby, to the Turnpike Road at or near Langley Mill in the said County. (Repealed by Cromford Bridge and Langley Mill Road Act 1830 (11 Geo. 4 & 1 Will. 4. c. c))
Bath (Improvement) Act 1766 (repealed)	6 Geo. 3. c. 70	30 April 1766
An Act to remove and regulate the publick Markets in the City of Bath; for widening certain Streets, Ways, and Passages, within the said City, and the Liberties and Precincts thereof; and for opening certain new Streets and Ways within the same; for better paving, cleansing, lighting, watching, and regulating, the Streets, Lanes, Ways, and Paclages there; to remove all Nuisances and Obstructions therein, and to prevent the same for the future; and for better supplying the Inhabitants of the said City, Liberties, and Precincts, with Water. (Repealed by Bath Improvement Act 1814 (54 Geo. 3. c. cv) and City of Bath Act 1851 (14 & 15 Vict. c. civ))
Wendover and Buckingham Road Act 1766 (repealed)	6 Geo. 3. c. 71	30 April 1766
An Act for enlarging the Term and Powers granted by an Act passed in the Twenty-fourth Year of His late Majesty King George the Second, (Note: Beaconsfield and Redhill Road Act 1750 (24 Geo. 2. c. 32)) for repairing several Roads in the County of Bucks, so far as the same relates to the Road between the Town of Wendover and the Town of Buckingham. (Repealed by Wendover and Buckingham Road Act 1810 (50 Geo. 3. c. xcix))
Richmond, Surrey, Poor Relief, Improvement and Roads Act 1766	6 Geo. 3. c. 72	30 April 1766
An Act for the Relief and Employment of the Poor, and for repairing the Highways, paving, cleansing, lighting, and watching, the Streets and other Places, in the Town and Parish of Richmond, in the County of Surrey; and for removing and preventing Annoyances, Obstructions, and Encroachments therein; and for hutting up a Road from the late Horse Ferry at Kew to Welt Sheene Lane, near Richmond Green; and for amending and keeping in Repair the Road from Kew Bridge to Richmond.
Berwick Roads Act 1766 (repealed)	6 Geo. 3. c. 73	30 April 1766
An Act for repairing the Road from the Borough of Lauder in the Shire of Berwick, to and through Kelso in the Shire of Roxburgh, to The Marchburn. (Repealed by Road from Lauder to Kelso Act 1829 (10 Geo. 4. c. lxvi) (Note: Incorrectly cited as "10 Geo. 3. c. lxvi" in the Chronological Table of the Statutes.))
Whitechapel (Poor Relief) Act 1766 (repealed)	6 Geo. 3. c. 74	30 April 1766
An Act to render more effectual an Act made in the Third Year of His present Majesty's Reign, (Note: Whitechapel (Poor Relief) Act 1763 (3 Geo. 3. c. 52)) for maintaining, regulating, and employing, the Poor within the Parish of Saint Mary Whitechapel, in the County of Middlesex. (Repealed by St. Mary's Whitechapel Improvement Act 1806 (46 Geo. 3. c. lxxxix))
Church of Allhallows, City Act 1766	6 Geo. 3. c. 75	30 April 1766
An Act to render more effectual an Act passed in the last Session of Parliament, (Note: Church of All Hallows, City Act 1765 (5 Geo. 3. c. 65)) for re-building the Parish Church of Allhallows on the Wall, in the City of London and for re-building the House belonging to the Rector of the said Parish; and for purchasing several Pieces of Ground, and Tenements thereon, to render the Passages to and from the said Church and House more commodious.
Bank of England (Buildings) Act 1766 (repealed)	6 Geo. 3. c. 76	30 April 1766
An Act to enable the Governor and Company of the Bank of England to purchase certain Houses and Ground, contiguous and near to The Bank; and for making certain Avenues leading thereto more commodious. (Repealed by Statute Law (Repeals) Act 1995 (c. 44))
Shrewsbury Bridge Act 1766	6 Geo. 3. c. 77	30 April 1766
An Act for repairing and widening the Stone Bridge in the Town of Shrewsbury.
Stort Navigation Act 1766	6 Geo. 3. c. 78	30 April 1766
An Act for making and continuing navigable the River Stort, in the Counties of Hertford and Essex.
Derby and Stafford Roads Act 1766 (repealed)	6 Geo. 3. c. 79	30 April 1766
An Act for repairing and widening the Road from Ashborne to Sudbury, and from Sudbury to Yoxall Bridge, and from the Turnpike Road upon Hatton Moor to Tutbury, in the Counties of Derby and Stafford. (Repealed by Ashbourne, Hatton Moor, Uttoxeter and Hadley Plain Roads Act 1830 (11 Geo. 4 & 1 Will. 4. c. lxxxix))
Brimington and Chesterfield Roads Act 1766 (repealed)	6 Geo. 3. c. 80	30 April 1766
An Act for repairing and widening the Roads from Brimmington and Chesterfield in the County of Derby, over the High Moors, to the several Places therein mentioned. (Repealed by Brimington, Chesterfield and High Moors Roads (Derbyshire) Act 1833 (3 & 4 Will. 4. c. lxxxviii) and Chesterfield, Dunstone and High Moors Turnpike Act 1865 (28 & 29 Vict. c. ccxv))
Whitby Harbour Act 1766 (repealed)	6 Geo. 3. c. 81	30 April 1766
An Act for further continuing the Duty of One Farthing per Chalder on Coals, granted by an Act of the First Year of Queen Anne, (Note: Taxation (No. 2) Act 1702 (1 Ann. St. 2. c. 4)) and revived and continued by an Act of the Eighth of King George the Second, (Note: Whitby Harbour Act 1734 (8 Geo. 2. c. 10)) for improving and repairing the Piers and Harbour of Whitby, in the County of York; and for better regulating the Shipping there. (Repealed by Whitby Piers and Harbour Act 1827 (7 & 8 Geo. 4. c. lxxviii))
Glasgow Roads Act 1766 (repealed)	6 Geo. 3. c. 82	30 April 1766
An Act to enlarge the Term and Powers of an Act made in the Twenty-sixth Year of King George the Second, (Note: Glasgow Roads Act 1753 (26 Geo. 2. c. 90)) for repairing several Roads leading into the City of Glasgow, so far as the same relates to the Districts of Roads from Inchbelly Bridge to Glasgow, and from Glasgow to Redburn Bridge; and for altering and ascertaining the Course of the last mentioned District of Road. (Repealed by Road from Glasgow to Redburn Bridge Act 1803 (43 Geo. 3. c. cx) and Road from Glasgow to Redburn Bridge Act 1804 (44 Geo. 3. c. lxv))
Lincoln and Notts Roads Act 1766 (repealed)	6 Geo. 3. c. 83	30 April 1766
An Act for enlarging the Term and Powers of so much of Two Acts, made in the Twelfth Year of the Reign of King George the First, (Note: Foston Bridge and Witham Common Road Act 1725 (12 Geo. 1. c. 16)) and in the Twelfth Year of the Reign of King George the Second, (Note: Lincoln and Nottinghamshire Roads Act 1738 (12 Geo. 2. c. 34)) for repairing the Road from Spittlegate Hill in the County of Lincoln, to Little Drayton in the County of Nottingham, as relates to the Road from Spittle-gate Hill to Boston Bridge in the County of Lincoln. (Repealed by Road from Foston Bridge (Lincolnshire) Act 1808 (48 Geo. 3. c. lxiii))
Cambridge Roads Act 1766 (repealed)	6 Geo. 3. c. 84	30 April 1766
An Act for repairing and widening the Road leading from the present Turnpike Road at Haverhill to Red Cross in the Parish of Shelford, in the County of Cambridge. (Repealed by Haverhill to Redcross Road (Suffolk, Cambridgeshire) Act 1830 (11 Geo. 4 & 1 Will. 4. c. xxxviii))
Tunbridge Wells to Uckfield Road Act 1766 (repealed)	6 Geo. 3. c. 85	30 April 1766
An Act for repairing the Road from the Turnpike at Tunbridge Wells in the County of Kent, to Ringles Cross near Uckfield in the County of Sussex. (Repealed by Tunbridge Wells and Uckfield Road Act 1829 (10 Geo. 4. c. lv))
Hants and Berkshire Roads Act 1766 (repealed)	6 Geo. 3. c. 86	14 May 1766
An Act for repairing and widening the Road from the present Turnpike Road in the Parish of Hursley in the County of Southampton, through the Borough of Andover, to the Town of Newbury in the County of Berks, and from Newbury to Chilton Pond and Newtown River. (Repealed by Hursley and Chilton Pond Turnpike Road Act 1828 (9 Geo. 4. c. xlvii))
Derby Roads (No. 3) Act 1766 (repealed)	6 Geo. 3. c. 87	14 May 1766
An Act for repairing and widening the Road from the Mansfield and Chesterfield Turnpike Road near the Nine Mile Stone from Mansfield, through Temple Normanton, Tupton New Enclosure, and Birkin Lanc, to Bunting Field Nook, in the Parish of Ashover, in the County of Derby. (Repealed by Road from the Mansfield and Chesterfield Turnpike Road and from Tupton Nether Green Act 1808 (48 Geo. 3. c. xxxviii) and Road from Temple Normanton and Road from Tupton Nether Green Act 1830 (11 Geo. 4 & 1 Will. 4. c. xci))
Stafford Roads (No. 2) Act 1766 (repealed)	6 Geo. 3. c. 88	14 May 1766
An Act for repairing and widening the Road from High Bridges, in the County of Stafford, to Uttoxeter, (Note: Uttoxeter, Staffordshire.) and from Spath (Note: Spath, Staffordshire.) to Hanging Bridge, (Note: Hanging Bridge over the River Dove, Mayfield, Staffordshire. 53°00′34″N 1°45′57″W) and from Tewnall's Lane (Note: Junction of B5014 Litchfield Road and A515 Tewnall's Lane. 52°43′03″N 1°50′35″W) to Yoxall Bridge, (Note: Yoxall Bridge on the A515 Yoxall Road between King's Bromley and Yoxall, Staffordshire. 52°45′27″N 1°48′26″W) in the said County. (Repealed by Road from High Bridges and from Spath (Staffordshire) Act 1808 (48 Geo. 3. c. xxxiv) and High Bridges and Uttoxeter, and Spath and Hanging Bridge Roads Act 1828 (9 Geo. 4. c. xxxii))
Stafford and Chester Roads Act 1766 (repealed)	6 Geo. 3. c. 89	14 May 1766
An Act for repairing and widening the Road leading from the Bottom of Church Lane in the Town of Newcastle under Lane (Note: Church Street, Newcastle-under-Lyme, Staffordshire.) in the County of Stafford, to the Turnpike Road leading from Woor to Chester near the Town of Nantwich in the County of Chester, (Note: The junction of Newcastle Road and London Road, Nantwich, Chester. 53°03′48″N 2°30′11″W) and from Chesterton through Alderley and Balterly to Ghorsly Hill. (Repealed by Road from Newcastle-under-Lyme to Nantwich Act 1829 (10 Geo. 4. c. cxv))
Lancaster and Yorks Roads Act 1766 (repealed)	6 Geo. 3. c. 90	14 May 1766
An Act for enlarging the Term and Powers of Two Acts, made in the Eighth (Note: Rochdale, Halifax and Ealand Road Act 1734 (8 Geo. 2. c. 7)) and Twenty-seventh (Note: Lancaster and Yorkshire Roads Act 1754 (27 Geo. 2. c. 37)) Years of His late Majesty, for repairing and widening the Road from Rochdale in the County Palatine of Lancaster, to the Towns of Halifax and Ealand in the County of York. (Repealed by Rochdale, Halifax and Ealand Road Act 1836 (6 & 7 Will. 4. c. viii))
Kent Roads Act 1766 (repealed)	6 Geo. 3. c. 91	14 May 1766
An Act to explain and amend an Act made in the last Session of Parliament, (Note: Kent Roads (No. 2) Act 1765 (5 Geo. 3. c. 71)) for repairing and widening the Road from Tonbridge to Maidstone, and from Watt's Cross to Cowden, in the County of Kent, so far as the same relates to the Road from Tonbridge to Maidstone. (Repealed by Tonbridge and Maidstone Road Act 1829 (10 Geo. 4. c. lxii))
Wareham and Purbeck Roads Act 1766 (repealed)	6 Geo. 3. c. 92	14 May 1766
An Act for amending, widening, altering, clearing, and keeping in Repair, several Roads, leading from the Market Cross in the Town of Wareham, and in Purbeck, in the County of Dorset. (Repealed by Wareham and Purbeck Roads Act 1830 (11 Geo. 4 & 1 Will. 4. c. ci))
Biddenden and Boundgate Road Act 1766 (repealed)	6 Geo. 3. c. 93	14 May 1766
An Act for amending and widening the Road from the Town of Biddenden (Note: Biddenden, Kent.) in The Weald of Kent, through the Towns of Smarden (Note: Smarden, Kent.) and Charing, (Note: Charing, Kent.) to join the Turnpike Road which leads from Ashford to Feversham, at a Place called Bound Gate. (Note: Boundsgate Corner, on the A251 Ashford Road, south of Badlesmere, Kent. 51°14′31″N 0°52′37″E) (Repealed by Biddenden and Boundgate Road (Kent) Act 1829 (10 Geo. 4. c. xxii))
Loughborough Navigation Act 1766	6 Geo. 3. c. 94	14 May 1766
An Act for making the River Soar navigable, from the River Trent, to or near Loughborough, in the County of Leicester; and for making Navigable Cuts, or Canals, from the said River Soar, to or near The Rushes and The Hermitage Pool at Loughborough, aforesaid.
Stafford Roads (No. 3) Act 1766 (repealed)	6 Geo. 3. c. 95	14 May 1766
An Act for repairing and widening the Road leading from High Bullen in Wednesbury, to the further End of Darlaston Lane next the Portway; and from thence, through Bilston, to the further End of Gibbet Lane, and several other Roads leading to and from Bilston, in the County of Stafford. (Repealed by Bilston Turnpike Roads (Staffordshire) Act 1829 (10 Geo. 4. c. lxxvi))
Trent and Mersey Canal Act 1766	6 Geo. 3. c. 96	14 May 1766
An Act for making a Navigable Cut, or Canal, from the River Trent, at or near Wilden Ferry in the County of Derby, to the River Mersey at or near Runcorn Gap.
Severn and Trent Canal Act 1766	6 Geo. 3. c. 97	14 May 1766
An Act for making and maintaining a Navigable Cut, or Canal, from the River Severn, between Bewdley and Titton Brook in the County of Worcester, to cross the River Trent, at or near Heywood Mill in the County of Stafford, and to communicate with a Canal intended to be made between the said River Trent and the River Mersey.
Dartford Roads Act 1766 (repealed)	6 Geo. 3. c. 98	6 June 1766
An Act for repairing and widening several Roads leading to the Town of Dartford, in the County of Kent. (Repealed by Dartford and Sevenoaks Road Act 1831 (1 Will. 4. c. viii))
Stafford Roads (No. 4) Act 1766 (repealed)	6 Geo. 3. c. 99	6 June 1766
An Act for repairing and widening the Road from Muckley Corner to Walsall and Wednesbury, and to Leigh Brook and Ocker Hill, and several other Roads, in the County of Stafford. (Repealed by Walsall and Muckley Corner Road Act 1830 (11 Geo. 4 & 1 Will. 4. c. cvi))
Holborn (Improvement) Act 1766 (repealed)	6 Geo. 3. c. 100	6 June 1766
An Act for the better regulating and employing the Poor; and for cleaning, lighting, and watching, the Squares, Streets, Lanes, and other Places, within that Part of the Parish of Saint Andrew Holbourn which lies above the Bars in the County of Middlesex, and the Parish of Saint George the Martyr in the same County. (Repealed by St. Andrew Holborn and St. George the Martyr Poor Relief Act 1799 (39 Geo. 3. c. xli))
River Chelmer Navigation Act 1766	6 Geo. 3. c. 101	6 June 1766
An Act for making the River Chelmer navigable, from the Port of Maldon to the Town of Chelmsford, in the Country of Essex.
Plymouth Dock Act 1766	6 Geo. 3. c. 102	6 June 1766
An Act to enable the Principal Officers and Commissioners of His Majesty's Navy to carry into Execution certain Articles of Agreement made for a Lease of Ground, for the Improvement of His Majesty's Dock Yard at Plymouth.

=== Private acts ===
Short title	Citation	Royal assent
Long title
Great Doddington Inclosure Act 1766	6 Geo. 3. c. 1 Pr.	19 February 1766
An Act for dividing and enclosing the Open and Common Fields, Common; Meadows, Common Pastures, Lot Grounds, and Commonable Waste Grounds in the Parish of Great Doddington, in the County of Northampton.
Naturalization of Hieronymus Burmester, John Wienholt, Julius Ridder and Peter Duval.	6 Geo. 3. c. 2 Pr.	19 February 1766
An Act for naturalizing Hieronymus Henry Burmester, John Wienholt, Julius Conrad Ridder, and Peter Duval.
Enabling James Oswald and Lord George Sackville to take, in Great Britain, the oaths of office of Vice Treasurer, Receiver General and Paymaster General of Ireland and qualifying them for the enjoyment of the said offices.	6 Geo. 3. c. 3 Pr.	18 March 1766
An Act to enable the Right Honourable James Oswald and the Right Honourable George Sackville, commonly called Lord George Sackville, to take, in Great Britain, the Oath of Office, as Vice Treasurer and Receiver General and Paymaster General of all His Majesty's Revenues in the Kingdom of Ireland; and to qualify themselves for the Enjoyment of the said Offices.
Bladon Inclosure Act 1766	6 Geo. 3. c. 4 Pr.	18 March 1766
An Act for dividing and enclosing the Common Fields, Common Pastures, Common ’Meadows, Common Grounds, and Commonable Lands, lying within the Manor and Parish of Bladon, in the County of Oxford.
Great Tew Inclosure Act 1766	6 Geo. 3. c. 5 Pr.	18 March 1766
An Act for dividing and enclosing Certain Open and Common Fields, Common Pastures, Common Meadows, and Commonable Waste Grounds, in the Manor, Parish, and Tything, of Great Tew, in the County of Oxford.
Haselton Inclosure Act 1766	6 Geo. 3. c. 6 Pr.	18 March 1766
An Act for confirming an Award made for dividing and enclosing several Common Fields and Downs in the Parish of Haselton, in the County of Gloucester.
Maugersbury Inclosure Act 1766	6 Geo. 3. c. 7 Pr.	18 March 1766
An Act for dividing and enclosing the Open Commons, Common Fields, Meadows, and Grounds, lying in the Hamlet of Maugersbury, in the Parish of Stow on the Wold, in the County of Gloucester.
Heddington Inclosure Act 1766	6 Geo. 3. c. 8 Pr.	18 March 1766
An Act for confirming Articles of Agreement, for dividing, allotting, and enclosing, the Common Field Lands within the Parish of Heddington, in the County of Wilts.
Thenford Inclosure Act 1766	6 Geo. 3. c. 9 Pr.	18 March 1766
An Act for dividing and enclosing the Common Fields, Common Pastures, Common Meadows, Common Grounds, and Waste Grounds, of and in the Manor and Parish of Thenford, otherwise Fenford, in the County of Northampton.
Bidford (Warwickshire) Inclosure Act 1766	6 Geo. 3. c. 10 Pr.	18 March 1766
An Act for dividing and enclosing a certain Open and Common Field, called Bidford Common Field, within the Parish of Bidford, in the County of Warwick.
Steeple Aston Inclosure Act 1766	6 Geo. 3. c. 11 Pr.	18 March 1766
An Act for dividing and enclosing the Common Fields, Common Pastures, Common Meadows, Common Grounds, and Commonable Lands, within the Manor and Parish of Steeple Aston, in the County of Oxford.
Waltham or Waltham in the Wolds (Leicestershire) Inclosure Act 1766	6 Geo. 3. c. 12 Pr.	18 March 1766
An Act for dividing and enclosing the Open Arable Fields and Common Pastures within the Parish of Waltham, otherwise Waltham in the Wolds, in the County of Leicester.
Braunston or Branston (Leicestershire) Inclosure Act 1766	6 Geo. 3. c. 13 Pr.	18 March 1766
An Act for dividing and enclosing the Open Arable Fields and Common Pastures within the Parish of Braunston, otherwise Branston, in the County of Leicester.
Croxton or Croxton Kerial (Leicestershire) Inclosure Act 1766	6 Geo. 3. c. 14 Pr.	18 March 1766
An Act for dividing and enclosing the Open Arable Fields and Common Pastures within the Parish of Croxton, otherwise Croxton Ketial, in the County of Leicester.
Winslow Inclosure Act 1766	6 Geo. 3. c. 15 Pr.	18 March 1766
An Act for dividing and enclosing the Open and Common Fields, Common Pastures, Common Meadows, Common Grounds, and Commonable Lands, in the Township of Winslow, in the County of Bucks.
Stillington Inclosure Act 1766	6 Geo. 3. c. 16 Pr.	18 March 1766
An Act for enclosing and dividing the Common waste Grounds, Open Fields, Open Meadows, Grounds, and Ings, within the Parish of Stillington, in the County of York.
Bridgewater Canal Act 1766	6 Geo. 3. c. 17 Pr.	18 March 1766
An Act to enable the most Noble Francis Duke of Bridgewater to extend a Branch of his Navigable Cut, or Canal, upon Sale Moor in the County of Chester, to the Market Town of Stockport in the said County.
Matthews' Divorce Act 1766	6 Geo. 3. c. 18 Pr.	18 March 1766
An Act to dissolve the Marriage of John Mathews with Ann Mathews his now Wise; and to enable him to marry again; and for other Purposes therein mentioned.
Michel's Naturalization Act 1766	6 Geo. 3. c. 19 Pr.	18 March 1766
An Act for naturalizing Jean Piere Michel.
Repton Inclosure Act 1766	6 Geo. 3. c. 20 Pr.	11 April 1766
An Act for dividing and enclosing the Open Fields, Common Meadows, Common Pastures, Commons, and Waste Grounds, within the Parish of Repton, in the County of Derby.
Haselor and Walcot (Warwickshire) Inclosure Act 1766	6 Geo. 3. c. 21 Pr.	11 April 1766
An Act for dividing and enclosing the Open Commons, Common Fields, Common Meadows, and Commonable Lands and Grounds, of and in the Manors of Haselor and Walcot, and of and in the Manor of Upton Haselor, in the Parish of Haselor, in the County of Warwick.
Cuddington with Bryn (Cheshire) Inclosure Act 1766	6 Geo. 3. c. 22 Pr.	11 April 1766
An Act for dividing and enclosing the Commons, or Waste Grounds, called Cuddington or Bryn Common in the Township of Cuddington with Bryn, in the Parish of Weverham, in the County of Chester.
Willington Inclosure Act 1766	6 Geo. 3. c. 23 Pr.	11 April 1766
An Act for dividing and enclosing the Open Fields, Common Meadows, Common Pastures, Commons, and Waste Grounds, within the Parish of Willington, in the County of Derby.
Upper and Nether Heyworth (Durham) Inclosure Act 1766	6 Geo. 3. c. 24 Pr.	11 April 1766
An Act for dividing and enclosing the Moor, Waste, or Common, in the several Townships, Villages, or Hamlets, of Upper Heworth and Nether Heworth, in the County Palatine of Durham.
Little Horwood Inclosure Act 1766	6 Geo. 3. c. 25 Pr.	11 April 1766
An Act for dividing and enclosing the Open and Common Fields, Common Pastures, Common Meadows, Common Grounds, and Commonable Lands, in the Parish of Little Horwood, in the County of Bucks.
Bessingby Inclosure Act 1766	6 Geo. 3. c. 26 Pr.	11 April 1766
An Act for dividing and enclosing the Open Fields, Grounds, and Wastes, within the Township or Parish of Bessingby, in the County of York.
Keddington Inclosure Act 1766	6 Geo. 3. c. 27 Pr.	11 April 1766
An Act for dividing and enclosing certain Open and Common Fields in the Manor and Parish of Keddington, in the County of Lincoln.
Beeford or Beeforth (Yorkshire) Inclosure Act 1766	6 Geo. 3. c. 28 Pr.	11 April 1766
An Act for dividing and enclosing the Open and Common Fields, Meadows, Pastures, Common and Waste Grounds, within the Township of Beeford, otherwise Beeforth, in the County of York.
Bradnop Inclosure Act 1766	6 Geo. 3. c. 29 Pr.	11 April 1766
An Act for dividing and enclosing the several Commons and Waste Grounds within the Manor of Bradnop, in the Parish of Leek, in the County of Stafford.
Hinton in the Hedges Inclosure Act 1766	6 Geo. 3. c. 30 Pr.	11 April 1766
An Act for dividing and enclosing the Open and Common Fields and Common Fields and commonable Lands lying within the Parish of Hinton in the Hedges, in the County of Northampton.
Grimoldby Inclosure Act 1766	6 Geo. 3. c. 31 Pr.	11 April 1766
An Act for dividing and enclosing the Open Common; Fields, Common Meadows, and other Commonable Lands, in the Parish of Grimoldby, in the County of Lincoln.
Hatherop Inclosure Act 1766	6 Geo. 3. c. 32 Pr.	11 April 1766
An Act for dividing and enclosing the Open and Common Field, Downs, and Commonable Lands, and allotting the Old Enclosures, lying within the Township and Parish of Hatherop, in the County of Gloucester.
Marston Inclosure Act 1766	6 Geo. 3. c. 33 Pr.	11 April 1766
An Act for dividing and enclosing several Open Fields, Commons, and Waste Grounds, within the Manor of Marston, in the County of the City of York.
Chetwode's Estate Act 1766	6 Geo. 3. c. 34 Pr.	11 April 1766
An Act for vesting Part of the settled Estate of Sir John Chetwode Baronet in Trustees, to be sold, for discharging Encumbrances affecting the same.
Aldcroft's Divorce Act 1766	6 Geo. 3. c. 35 Pr.	11 April 1766
An Act to dissolve the Marriage of Charles Aldcroft Gentleman with Sarah Shewell bis now Wife; and to enable him to marry again; and for other Purposes therein mentioned.
Brice's Name Act 1766	6 Geo. 3. c. 36 Pr.	11 April 1766
An Act for enabling Robert Brice Esquire and his Heirs to take and use the Name, and bear the Arms, of Kingesmill.
Enabling William Duke of Devonshire to take, in England, the oath of office of High Treasurer of Ireland and to qualify himself in England for the enjoyment of the said office.	6 Geo. 3. c. 37 Pr.	30 April 1766
An Act to enable the moil Noble William Duke of Devonshire to take, in England, the Oath of Office of High Treasurer of Ireland; and to qualify himself in England for the Enjoyment of the said Office.
Canterbury Cathedral Estate Act 1766	6 Geo. 3. c. 38 Pr.	30 April 1766
An Act to enable the Dean and Chapter of Canterbury to grant Leases of their Estate in the Parish of Saint Olave Southwark.
Viscount Midleton's Estate Act 1766	6 Geo. 3. c. 39 Pr.	30 April 1766
An Act for vesting Fart of the Fee Simple Estate of George late Lord Viscount Midleton of the Kingdom of Ireland in Trustees, to be sold, for paying the Debts, Legacies, and Encumbrances, mentioned in, and appointed to be paid by, his Will; and for executing and effectuating several Contracts entered into by him, for selling and leasing divers Farms and Lands in Ireland; and for making the Exemplification of his Will Evidence in Law and Equity.
Clayton's Estate Act 1766	6 Geo. 3. c. 40 Pr.	30 April 1766
An Act for vesting certain Manors, Messuages, Farms, Lands, Tenements, and Hereditaments, in the County of Surrey, devised by the Will of Sir William Clayton Baronet, deceased, in Trustees, to be sold; and for applying the Monies arising by such Sale in the Purchase or other Lands, to be settled to the like Uses.
Henley's Estate Act 1766	6 Geo. 3. c. 41 Pr.	30 April 1766
An Act for vesting the Freehold and Leasehold Estates late of Robert Henley Esquire, deceased, in Trustees, to be sold, to raise Money, to be applied to pay off the Debts, Encumbrances, and Legacies, charged upon and affecting the same, under the Direction of the Court of Chancery; and for laying out the Surplus Money in the Bank of England, subject to the further Order of the said Court.
Blagrave's Estate Act 1766	6 Geo. 3. c. 42 Pr.	30 April 1766
An Act for vesting several Copyhold Estates of Ann Blagrave Widow and others in Trustees, to be sold and for laying out the Money arising thereby in the Purchase of other Estates, to be settled to the same Uses to which the said Copyhold Estates stand limited.
Maryon's Estate Act 1766	6 Geo. 3. c. 43 Pr.	30 April 1766
An Act to empower John Jones Esquire and Margaretta Maria his Wife, late Margaretta Maria Weller Widow, and other the Devisees of John Maryon Clerk, deceased, to make Leases of the Manor of Charlton, and of Lands, Tenements, and Hereditaments, in the said Manor, and also in the Parishes of Woolwich and Plumstead, in the County of Kent.
Smith's Estate Act 1766	6 Geo. 3. c. 44 Pr.	30 April 1766
An Act for vesting Part of the settled Estate of John Silvester Smith Esquire in Trustees, to be sold, for discharging Encumbrances affecting the same.
Tufnell's Estate Act 1766	6 Geo. 3. c. 45 Pr.	30 April 1766
An Act to enable George Foster Tuffnell Esquire to grant Building Leases of Estates devised to him by Sir William Halton Baronet, in the County of Middlesex.
Arncliff Inclosure Act 1766	6 Geo. 3. c. 46 Pr.	30 April 1766
An Act for dividing and enclosing the several Stinted Pastures called Cow Close, Welt Moor, and Clowder otherwise Clowther, within the Township of Arncliffe, in the West Riding of the County of York.
Naburn Inclosure Act 1766	6 Geo. 3. c. 47 Pr.	30 April 1766
An Act for dividing and enclosing several Common Arable Fields, Common Meadow Grounds, and the Moor or Common, within the Manor and Township of Naburn, in the East Riding of the County of York.
Blaby Inclosure Act 1766	6 Geo. 3. c. 48 Pr.	30 April 1766
An Act for dividing and enclosing the Open and Common Fields, Meadows, Pastures, and Walle Grounds, in the Parish of Blaby, in the County of Leicester.
Countesthorpe Inclosure Act 1766	6 Geo. 3. c. 49 Pr.	30 April 1766
An Act for dividing and enclosing the Common Fields, Meadows, Pastures, and Waste Grounds, in the Parish of Countesthorpe, in the County of Leicester.
Hexton Inclosure Act 1766	6 Geo. 3. c. 50 Pr.	30 April 1766
An Act for dividing and enclosing the Common Fields, and other Commonable Lands and Grounds, in the Parish of Hexton, in the County of Hertford, except a Common Failure called The Cow Common.
Walsworth Inclosure Act 1766	6 Geo. 3. c. 51 Pr.	30 April 1766
An Act for dividing and enclosing the Open and Common Fields and Grounds in the Hamlet of Walsworth, in the Parish of Hitchin, in the County of Hertford.
Bourn Inclosure Act 1766	6 Geo. 3. c. 52 Pr.	30 April 1766
An Act for allotting, dividing, enclosing, and draining, several Open and Common Fields, Meadows, Waste and Fen Grounds, within the Manor and Parish of Bourn, in the County of Lincoln.
Pattrington Inclosure Act 1766	6 Geo. 3. c. 53 Pr.	30 April 1766
An Act for dividing and enclosing Certain Open Common Fields, Lands, and Grounds, in the Parish of Pattrington in Holderness, in the East Riding of the County of York.
Brigham Inclosure Act 1766	6 Geo. 3. c. 54 Pr.	30 April 1766
An Act for dividing and enclosing the Open Fields, Meadows, Pastures, and Commons, or Commonable Grounds, in the Township of Brigham, in the Parish of Boston, in the East Riding of the County of York.
Lubnam or Lubenham (Leicestershire) Inclosure Act 1766	6 Geo. 3. c. 55 Pr.	30 April 1766
An Act for dividing and enclosing the Open and Common fields of Lubnam, otherwise Lubenham, in the County of Leicester.
Berkeley Square (Middlesex) Inclosure and Improvement Act 1766	6 Geo. 3. c. 56 Pr.	30 April 1766
An Act for enclosing, paving, cleansing, light and adorning Berkeley Square, in the Parish of Saint George Hanover Square, in the County of Middlesex.
Duke of Grafton's Estate Act 1766	6 Geo. 3. c. 57 Pr.	14 May 1766
An Act for vesting Part of a Messuage, with the Appurtenances, entailed by the Will of the most Noble Charles late Duke of Grafton, deceased, in Trustees, to be sold; and for purchasing another Messuage or Lands, to be settled to the like Uses.
Earl and Countess of Powis' estate: sale of a mansion house in Albemarle St. and purchasing and settling other lands and hereditaments.	6 Geo. 3. c. 58 Pr.	14 May 1766
An Act for vesting the Mansion-house of the Earl and Countess of Powis, in Albemarle Street, now settled on them and their Issue, in Trustees, to sell the same; and to lay out the Money arising by such Sale in the Purchase of Lands and Hereditaments, to be settled to the like Uses.
Earl of Portsmouth's Estate Act 1766	6 Geo. 3. c. 59 Pr.	14 May 1766
An Act for vesting certain Manors, Rectories, Lands, Tithes, Tenements, and Hereditaments, in the Counties of Somerset and Devon, devised by the Will of John lare Earl of Portsmouth, deceased, in Trustees, to be sold; and for applying the Monies arising by such Sale in the Purchase of other Manors, Rectories, Lands, Tithes, Tenements, or Hereditaments, to be settled to the Uses limited by the said Will.
Earl Ferrers' Estate Act 1766	6 Geo. 3. c. 60 Pr.	14 May 1766
An Act for vesting in Trustees the settled Estate of Washington Earl Ferrers, in the County of Derby, to be sold, for satisfying the Encumbrances and Portions affecting the same and the rest of his settled Estates; and for other Purposes therein mentioned.
Enabling Sir Thomas Gooch and his sons, their guardians and their sons guardians to grant building leases on lands in Birmingham (Warwickshire) to exchange lands and grant a piece of land there for building a church and churchyard.	6 Geo. 3. c. 61 Pr.	14 May 1766
An Act to enable Sir Thomas Gooch Baronet, and his Sons Thomas Gooch, William Gooch, and their Gooch, and their Guardians, and the Guardians of their Sons, during their Minority, to grant Building Leases of certain Lands in Birmingham, in the County of Warwick; and to grant a Piece of Land, lying in the same Town, for the Purposes of building Church and making a Church Yard; and to exchange some Lands there.
Parsons' Estate Act 1766	6 Geo. 3. c. 62 Pr.	14 May 1766
An Act for Sale of the Manor, Capital Messuage, and late dissolved Priory, of Ryegate, in the County of Surrey; and also of several Freehold and Copyhold Lands, Tenements, and Hereditaments, in the Counties of Surrey and Sussex, late the Estate of Sarah Parsons Widow, deceased, for raising Money to discharge Encumbrances affecting the same.
Lloyd's Estate Act 1766	6 Geo. 3. c. 63 Pr.	14 May 1766
An Act for the Sale and Disposition of Part of the settled Estate of Thomas Lloyd Esquire, for paying and discharging the Debts and Encumbrances affecting the same; and for providing an Equivalent or Compensation for the same to the Issue Inheritable under his Marriage Settlement.
Nedham's Estate Act 1766	6 Geo. 3. c. 64 Pr.	14 May 1766
An Act for confirming the Sale of Part of the Estates late of Robert Nedham Esquire, deceased, situate in the Kingdom of Ireland, for the Term of Five Hundred Years, to George Nedham Esquire; for confirming an Agreement made between the Widow and Children of the said Robert Nedham; and for vesting Part of the said Robert Nedham's said Estates in Trustees, to be sold, for the Payment of the Debts, Legacies, and other Encumbrances, affecting such Estates; and for other the Purposes therein mentioned.
Ince's Estate Act 1766	6 Geo. 3. c. 65 Pr.	14 May 1766
An Act for vesting an undivided Moiety of certain Messuages, Lands, Tenements, and Hereditaments, in the several Counties of Bedford, Northampton, Leicester, and Essex, and in the City of London late the Estate of Piggott Ince Esquire, deceased, and Mary late the Wife and now the Widow of the said Piggott Ince, in Trustees, to be sold, and disposed of, in Pursuance of certain Agreements; and for discharging Debts and Encumbrances, and other the Purposes therein mentioned; and for applying and placing out the Surplus of the Purchase-money upon the Trusts; and for the Purposes therein mentioned.
Establishing a proposal made by William Constable to the charity for relief of poor widows and children of clergymen concerning land called Cherry Cobb Sand (Yorkshire).	6 Geo. 3. c. 66 Pr.	14 May 1766
An Act to establish a Proposal, made by William Constable Esquire to the Governors of the Charity for the Relief of the poor Widows and Children of Clergymen, in relation to a Piece or Parcel of Land called Cherry Cobb Sand, in the County of York.
Aston and Wales (Yorkshire) Inclosure Act 1766	6 Geo. 3. c. 67 Pr.	14 May 1766
An Act for dividing and enclosing several Open Fields, Commons, or Waste Grounds, situate, lying, and being, within the Manors of Aston and Wales, in the County York.
Carlton Forehoe and Kimberley (Norfolk) Inclosure Act 1766	6 Geo. 3. c. 68 Pr.	14 May 1766
An Act for dividing and enclosing the Open and Common Fields, Half-year Lands, Commons, and Waste Grounds, in the Parishes of Carlton, Foreboe, and Kimberley, in the County of Norfolk.
Barnetby upon the Woulds Inclosure Act 1766	6 Geo. 3. c. 69 Pr.	14 May 1766
An Act for dividing and enclosing several Open and Common Fields, Common Meadows, Commons, and Waste Grounds, within the Lordship or Liberty of Barnetby upon the Woulds, in the County of Lincoln.
Bowes Inclosure Act 1766	6 Geo. 3. c. 70 Pr.	14 May 1766
An Act for dividing and enclosing certain Open Grounds, or Pastures, and some Parts of a certain Moor, or Tract of Waste Land, within the Manor of Bowes, in the County of York.
Scothorn and Sudbrooke (Yorkshire) Inclosure Act 1766	6 Geo. 3. c. 71 Pr.	14 May 1766
An Act for dividing and enclosing certain Open Arable Fields, Meadows, Pasture, and Waste Grounds, in the Parishes of Scothorn and Sudbroke, in the County of Lincoln.
Barnby Dun Inclosure Act 1766	6 Geo. 3. c. 72 Pr.	14 May 1766
An Act for enclosing and dividing a Common, called Thorpe Marsh, and a Piece of Land called Grumble Hirst, within the Parish of Barmby upon Dunn, in the County of York.
Corby Inclosure Act 1766	6 Geo. 3. c. 73 Pr.	14 May 1766
An Act for dividing and enclosing the several Open Fields, Meadows, Pastures, and Waste Grounds, within the Manor and Parish of Corby, in the County of Lincoln.
Holderness Drainage Act 1766	6 Geo. 3. c. 74 Pr.	14 May 1766
An Act to render more effectual an Act made in the Fourth Year of His present Majesty, (Note: Holderness Drainage Act 1764 (4 Geo. 3. c. 47 Pr.)) for draining, preserving, and improving, the Low Grounds and Carrs, lying and being in the Parishes, Townships; Hamlets, Lordships, Precincts, and Territories, of Sutton Ganstead, Swine Benningholme, Benningholme Grange, and Fairholme, North Skirlaugh, Rowtont Arnold, Long Riston, Leven Heigholme, and Hallytree Holme, Brandes Burton, and Burshall, Eske, Tickton, Weel, Routh, Meaux, and Waghen otherwise Wawn, in Holdernesse, in the East Riding of the County of York.
Harlestone Inclosure Act 1766	6 Geo. 3. c. 75 Pr.	14 May 1766
An Act for dividing and enclosing the Open Common Fields, Common Pastures, Common Grounds, Heath, and Waste Grounds, within the Manor and Parish of Harleston, in the County of Northampton.
Laighton Bromswold or Laighton Ecclesia (Huntingdonshire) Inclosure Act 1766	6 Geo. 3. c. 76 Pr.	14 May 1766
An Act for dividing and enclosing the Open and Common Fields, Meadows, Pastures, and Commonable Lands and Grounds, in the Parish of Laighton Bromswold, otherwise Laighton Ecclesia, in the County of Huntingdon.
Kettlethorpe Inclosure Act 1766	6 Geo. 3. c. 77 Pr.	14 May 1766
An Act for dividing and enclosing certain Open Lands, Meadows, and Free Commons, in the Parish of Kettlethorpe, in the County of Lincoln.
Cottingham Inclosure Act 1766	6 Geo. 3. c. 78 Pr.	14 May 1766
An Act for dividing, enclosing, and draining, certain Lands, Grounds, and Common Pastures, in the Parish of Cottingham, in the East Riding of the County of York.
Ratchiffe Culey Inclosure Act 1766	6 Geo. 3. c. 79 Pr.	14 May 1766
An Act for dividing and enclosing several Open Fields, Meadows, and Commons, within the Lordship of Ratcliffe Culey, in the County of Leicester.
Kingsthorpe Inclosure Act 1766 (repealed)	6 Geo. 3. c. 80 Pr.	14 May 1766
An Act for dividing and enclosing the Open and Common Fields, Common Meadows, Common Pastures, Common Grounds, Heath, and Waste Grounds, within the Manor and Lordship of Kingsthorpe, in the County of Northampton. (Repealed by Northampton Act 1988 (c. xxix))
Ryton or Ruyton (Warwickshire) Inclosure Act 1766	6 Geo. 3. c. 81 Pr.	14 May 1766
An Act for dividing and enclosing the Open and Common Fields, Common Lands, Common Meadows, Common Pastures, Common Grounds, Heath, and Waste Lands, or Grounds, in the Hamlet or Township of Ryton, otherwise Ruyton, in the Parish of Bulkington, in the County of Warwick.
Bickar Inclosure Act 1766	6 Geo. 3. c. 82 Pr.	14 May 1766
An Act for dividing and enclosing the Open and Common Fields, Meadows Common Fen, and other Commonable Places, in the Parish of Bickar, in the County of Lincoln; and for draining and improving the same.
St. John's Church, Beverley Estate Act 1766	6 Geo. 3. c. 83 Pr.	14 May 1766
An Act for vesting certain Estates in the County of Lincoln in Trustees, and to enable them to appropriate the Rents and Profits thereof, and also certain Sums of Money (subject to the Trusts declared by the Will of Sir Michael Wharton Knight, deceased,) for the Augmentation of the Revenues of the Curacies of the late Collegiate Church of Saint John, in Beverley, in the County of York; and for erecting an Organ in the said Church; and for other Purposes therein mentioned.
Burton's Name Act 1766	6 Geo. 3. c. 84 Pr.	14 May 1766
An Act to enable Richard Burton Esquire and his Issue to bear and use the Surname and Arms of Phillipson, pursuant to the Will of John Phillipson Esquire, deceased.
Naturalization of Godhard Suthoff, John Cornud, Renire Bentinck, Francis Mavit, Justus Blanckenhagen, Francis Menet and John Haldimand.	6 Geo. 3. c. 85 Pr.	14 May 1766
An Act for naturalizing Godhard Sutthoff, John Peter Cornud, Renira Bentinck, Aymere Mavit, Justus Blackenhagen, Francis Menet, and John Abraham Haldimand.
Charlesson's Naturalization Act 1766	6 Geo. 3. c. 86 Pr.	14 May 1766
An Act for naturalizing Laurence Charleston.
Naturalization of Peter Facon and John Tourneisen.	6 Geo. 3. c. 87 Pr.	14 May 1766
An Act for naturalizing Peter Facon and John James Tourneisen.
Pleydell's Estate Act 1766	6 Geo. 3. c. 88 Pr.	6 June 1766
An Act for vesting the settled Estates of Edmond Morton Pleydell Esquire, in the Counties of York and Lincoln, in Trustees, to be sold; and for laying out the Money to arise by such Sale in the Purchase of other Lands, to be settled to the like Uses.
Balderton Inclosure Act 1766	6 Geo. 3. c. 89 Pr.	6 June 1766
An Act for dividing and enclosing the Open Fields, Meadow, Common Pastures, and Waste Grounds, in the Parish of Balderton, in the County of Nottingham.
Adderbury Inclosure Act 1766	6 Geo. 3. c. 90 Pr.	6 June 1766
An Act for dividing and enclosing certain Open and Common Fields, and Commonable Lands, in the Parish of Adderbury, in the County of Oxford.
Little Ellingham Inclosure Act 1766	6 Geo. 3. c. 91 Pr.	6 June 1766
An Act for dividing and enclosing the Commons and Waste Grounds in the Manor and Parish of Little Ellingham, in the County of Norfolk.
Darley Inclosure Act 1766	6 Geo. 3. c. 92 Pr.	6 June 1766
An Act for dividing and enclosing a certain Common, Parcel of Waste Ground, or Moor, liquate in the Liberty of Darley, in the County of Derby, called Darley Common.
Stretham Common Drainage Act 1766	6 Geo. 3. c. 93 Pr.	6 June 1766
An Act for draining and preserving Streatham Common, in the Isle of Ely and County of Cambridge; and for empowering the Commissioners for putting in Execution an Act for the effectual Draining and Preservation of Waterbeach Level, (Note: Waterbeach Level Drainage Act 1740 (14 Geo. 2. c. 24)) in the County of Cambridge, and to establish an Agreement made between the Lord of the Manor of Waterbeach cum Benny and the Commoners within the Said Manor, to raise a Sum of Money, to pay the Debts owing upon the Credit of the Said Act.
Naturalization of Peter Delaroche and John le Chevalier.	6 Geo. 3. c. 94 Pr.	6 June 1766
An Act for naturalizing Peter de la Roche and John James le Chevalier.

=== Sources ===
- "6 George III - 1765-6". The Statutes at Large. Vol. 27. Cambridge, Printed by Joseph Bentham. 1762 – via Internet Archive.
- "6 George III - 1765-6". The Statutes at Large. Vol. 27. Cambridge, Printed by Joseph Bentham. 1762 – via Google Books.
- "6 George III - 1765-6". The Statutes at Large. Vol. 27. 1762 – via Internet Archive.
- Journals of the House of Commons. Vol. 30. London: His Majesty's Stationery Office. 1803. pp. 437–845.
- Chronological Table of and Index to the Statutes. Vol. 1: To the End of the Session 59 Vict. Sess. 2 (1895) (13th ed.). London: Her Majesty's Stationery Office. 1896. pp. 123–124 – via Google Books.

== 7 Geo. 3 ==
The sixth session of the 12th Parliament of Great Britain, which met from 11 November 1766 until 2 July 1767.

This session was also traditionally cited as 7 G. 3.

=== Public acts ===
Short title	Citation	Royal assent
Long title
Importation and Exportation (No. 4) Act 1766 (repealed)	7 Geo. 3. c. 1	16 December 1766
An Act to continue an Act made in the Fifth Year of the Reign of His present Majesty, intituled, "An Act for Importation of Salted Beef, Pork, Bacon, and Butter, from Ireland," (Note: Importation Act 1765 (5 Geo. 3. c. 1)) for a limited Time. (Repealed by Statute Law Revision Act 1867 (30 & 31 Vict. c. 59))
Importation and Exportation (No. 5) Act 1766 (repealed)	7 Geo. 3. c. 2	16 December 1766
An Act to amend so much of an Act made in the last Session of Parliament, (Note: Customs, etc. Act 1766 (6 Geo. 3. c. 52)) intituled, "An Act for repealing certain Duties in the British Colonies and Plantations granted by several Acts of Parliament, and also the Duties imposed by an Act made in the last Session of Parliament (Note: Stamp Act 1765 (5 Geo. 3. c. 35)) upon certain East India Goods exported from Great Britain, and for granting other Duties instead thereof; and for further encouraging, regulating, and securing, several Branches of the Trade of this Kingdom and the British Dominions in America, as relates to the Exportation of Non-enumerated Goods from the British Colonies in America. (Repealed by Statute Law Revision Act 1867 (30 & 31 Vict. c. 59))
Importation and Exportation (No. 6) Act 1766 (repealed)	7 Geo. 3. c. 3	16 December 1766
An Act to prohibit, for a limited Time, the Exportation of Corn, Grain, Meal, Malt, Flour, Bread, Biscuit, and Starch; and also the Extraction of Low Wines and Spirits from Wheat and Wheat Flour. (Repealed by Statute Law Revision Act 1867 (30 & 31 Vict. c. 59))
Importation and Exportation (No. 7) Act 1766 (repealed)	7 Geo. 3. c. 4	16 December 1766
An Act for allowing the Importation of Wheat and Wheat Flour from His Majesty's Colonies in America into this Kingdom, for a limited Time, free of Duty. (Repealed by Statute Law Revision Act 1867 (30 & 31 Vict. c. 59))
Importation and Exportation (No. 8) Act 1766 (repealed)	7 Geo. 3. c. 5	16 December 1766
An Act for allowing the Importation of Wheat and Wheat Flour from any Part of Europe into this Kingdom, for a limited Time, free of Duty. (Repealed by Statute Law Revision Act 1867 (30 & 31 Vict. c. 59))
Malt Duties (No. 2) Act 1766 (repealed)	7 Geo. 3. c. 6	16 December 1766
An Act for Continuing, and granting to His, Majesty, certain Duties upon Malt, Mum, Cyder, and Perry, for the Service of the Year One Thousand Seven Hundred and Sixty-seven. (Repealed by Statute Law Revision Act 1867 (30 & 31 Vict. c. 59))
Indemnity (No. 3) Act 1766 (repealed)	7 Geo. 3. c. 7	16 December 1766
An Act for indemnifying such Persons as have acted for the Service of the Publick, in advising or carrying into Execution the Order of Council of the Twenty-sixth Day of September last, for laying an Embargo on all Ships laden with Wheat and Wheat Flour; and for preventing Suits in Consequence of the said Embargo. (Repealed by Statute Law Revision Act 1867 (30 & 31 Vict. c. 59))
Importation (No. 4) Act 1766 (repealed)	7 Geo. 3. c. 8	16 December 1766
An Act for allowing the Importation of Oats and Oat-meal, Rye and Rye-meal, into this Kingdom, for a limited Time, free of Duty. (Repealed by Statute Law Revision Act 1867 (30 & 31 Vict. c. 59))
Justices Oaths Act 1766 (repealed)	7 Geo. 3. c. 9	16 December 1766
An Act for obviating Doubts which have arisen with respect to so much of an Act made in the First Year of the Reign of His present Majesty, (Note: Justices' Qualification Act 1760 (1 Geo. 3. c. 13)) intituled, "An Act to amend an Act passed in the Eighteenth Year of the Reign of King George the Second, (Note: Justices Qualification Act 1744 (18 Geo. 2. c. 20)) concerning the Qualification of Justices of the Peace; and for other Purposes therein mentioned," as directs the taking of certain Oaths by Justices of the Peace on the issuing of any new Commission of the Peace. (Repealed by Statute Law Revision Act 1964 (c. 79))
Mutiny (No. 2) Act 1766 (repealed)	7 Geo. 3. c. 10	27 February 1767
An Act for punishing Mutiny and Desertion; and for the better Payment of the Army and their Quarters. (Repealed by Statute Law Revision Act 1867 (30 & 31 Vict. c. 59))
Importation (No. 5) Act 1766 (repealed)	7 Geo. 3. c. 11	27 February 1767
An Act for allowing the Importation of Wheat and Wheat Flour, free of Duty, from any Part of Europe, for a further Time than is allowed by any Act made in this Session of Parliament; (Note: Importation and Exportation (No. 8) Act 1766 (7 Geo. 3. c. 5)) and for permitting the free Importation of Barley, Barley-meal, and Pulse, into this Kingdom, for a limited Time. (Repealed by Statute Law Revision Act 1867 (30 & 31 Vict. c. 59))
Importation (No. 6) Act 1766 (repealed)	7 Geo. 3. c. 12	27 February 1767
An Act to discontinue, for a limited Time, the Duties payable upon the Importation of Tallow, Hog's Lard, and Grease. (Repealed by Statute Law Revision Act 1867 (30 & 31 Vict. c. 59))
Marine Mutiny (No. 2) Act 1766 (repealed)	7 Geo. 3. c. 13	23 March 1767
An Act for the Regulation of His Majesty's Marine Forces while on Shore. (Repealed by Statute Law Revision Act 1867 (30 & 31 Vict. c. 59))
Land Tax (No. 2) Act 1766 (repealed)	7 Geo. 3. c. 14	23 March 1767
An Act for granting an Aid to His Majesty, by a Land Tax, to be railed in Great Britain, for the Service of the Year One Thousand Seven Hundred and Sixty-seven. (Repealed by Statute Law Revision Act 1867 (30 & 31 Vict. c. 59))
Militia Act 1766 (repealed)	7 Geo. 3. c. 15	23 March 1767
An Act for giving further Time to His Majesty's Lieutenants, Deputy Lieutenants, Justices, and Clerks of the Peace, and others, for carrying into Execution certain Parts of an Act passed in the last Session, (Note: Militia Pay, etc. Act 1766 (6 Geo. 3. c. 30)) for Pay and Cloathing of the Militia; and for indemnifying such Lieutenants, Deputy Lieutenants, and Clerks of the Peace, and others, who have neglected to carry such Parts of the said Act into Execution. (Repealed by Statute Law Revision Act 1867 (30 & 31 Vict. c. 59))
Unfunded Debt Act 1766 (repealed)	7 Geo. 3. c. 16	3 April 1767
An Act for raising a certain Sum of Money, by Loans or Exchequer Bills, for the Service of the Year One Thousand Seven Hundred and Sixty-seven. (Repealed by Statute Law Revision Act 1867 (30 & 31 Vict. c. 59))
Militia Pay, etc. (No. 2) Act 1766 (repealed)	7 Geo. 3. c. 17	3 April 1767
An Act for defraying the Charge of the Pay and Cloathing of the Militia, in that Part of Great Britain called England, for One Year, beginning the Twenty-fifth Day of March One Thousand Seven Hundred and Sixty-seven; for the more effectually punishing Serjeants, Drummers, and Fifers, for Misbehaviour and Desertion; for securing Deserters from the Militia Regiments; and for explaining and amending so much of an Act, passed in the last Session of Parliament, as relates to enlisting Militia Men into His Majesty's other Forces. (Repealed by Statute Law Revision Act 1867 (30 & 31 Vict. c. 59))
British Museum Act 1767 or the British Museum Act 1766 (repealed)	7 Geo. 3. c. 18	15 April 1767
An Act to enable the Trustees of the British Museum to exchange, sell, or dispose of any Duplicates of printed Books, Medals, Coins, or other Curiosities; and for laying out the Money arising by such Sale in the Purchase of other Things that may be wanting in, or proper for, the said Museum. (Repealed by British Museum Act 1963 (c. 24))
Provision for Duke of York, etc. Act 1766 (repealed)	7 Geo. 3. c. 19	15 April 1767
An Act to enable His Majesty to settle certain Annuities on their Royal Highnesses the Dukes of York, Gloucester, and Cumberland. (Repealed by Statute Law Revision Act 1867 (30 & 31 Vict. c. 59))
Customs (No. 2) Act 1766 (repealed)	7 Geo. 3. c. 20	15 April 1767
An Act for granting to His Majesty additional Duties upon Bast or Straw, Chip, Cane, and Horse Hair, Hats and Bonnets, and upon certain Materials for making the same, imported into this Kingdom. (Repealed by Statute Law Revision Act 1867 (30 & 31 Vict. c. 59))
Justices Quorum Act 1766 (repealed)	7 Geo. 3. c. 21	15 April 1767
An Act to obviate Inconveniencies which may arise with respect to the Execution of several Acts of Parliament, in such Cities, Boroughs, Towns Corporate, Franchises, and Liberties, as have only One Justice of the Peace of the Quorum qualified to act within the same. (Repealed by Statute Law Revision Act 1948 (11 & 12 Geo. 6. c. 62))
Importation (No. 7) Act 1766 (repealed)	7 Geo. 3. c. 22	15 April 1767
An Act for further allowing the Importation of Wheat and Wheat Flour, Bailey, Barley-meal, and Pulse, free of Duty, into this Kingdom, from any Part of Europe. (Repealed by Statute Law Revision Act 1867 (30 & 31 Vict. c. 59))
Coal Metage, etc., London Act 1766 (repealed)	7 Geo. 3. c. 23	15 April 1767
An Act to prevent Frauds and Abuses in the Admeasurement of Coals, sold by Wharf Measure, within the City of London and the Liberties thereof; and between Tower Dock and Lime-house Hole, in the County of Middlesex. (Repealed by Statute Law (Repeals) Act 1976 (c. 16))
National Debt (No. 3) Act 1766 (repealed)	7 Geo. 3. c. 24	20 May 1767
An Act for raising the Sum of One Million Five Hundred Thousand Pounds, by Way of Annuities, and a Lottery attended with Annuities, to be charged on the Sinking Fund. (Repealed by Statute Law Revision Act 1870 (33 & 34 Vict. c. 69))
National Debt (No. 4) Act 1766 (repealed)	7 Geo. 3. c. 25	20 May 1767
An Act for redeeming One Fourth Part of the Joint Stock of Annuities, established by an Act made in the Third Year of His present Majesty's Reign, intituled, "An Act for granting to His Majesty several additional Duties upon Wines imported into this Kingdom, and certain Duties upon all Cyder and Perry; and for raising the Sum of Three Millions Five Hundred Thousand Pounds, by Way of Annuities and Lotteries, to be charged on the said Duties." (Note: National Debt (No. 2) Act 1762 (3 Geo. 3. c. 12)) (Repealed by Statute Law Revision Act 1870 (33 & 34 Vict. c. 69))
National Debt (No. 5) Act 1766 (repealed)	7 Geo. 3. c. 26	20 May 1767
An Act for redeeming the Remainder of the Joint Stock of Annuities, established by an Act made in the Third Year of His present Majesty's Reign, (Note: National Debt Act 1762 (3 Geo. 3. c. 9)) in respect of several Navy, Victualling, and Transport Bills, and Ordnance Debentures. (Repealed by Statute Law Revision Act 1870 (33 & 34 Vict. c. 69))
Edinburgh (Improvements) Act 1766 (repealed)	7 Geo. 3. c. 27	20 May 1767
An Act for extending the Royalty of the City of Edinburgh over certain adjoining Lands; and for giving Powers to the Magistrates of Edinburgh for the Benefit of the said City; and to enable His Majesty to grant Letters Patents for establishing a Theatre in the City of Edinburgh, or Suburbs thereof. (Repealed by Edinburgh Charity Workhouse Act 1844 (7 & 8 Vict. c. vi) and Edinburgh Municipal and Police Act 1879 (42 & 43 Vict. c. cxxxii))
Customs (No. 3) Act 1766 (repealed)	7 Geo. 3. c. 28	20 May 1767
An Act for granting to His Majesty additional Duties upon certain Linen Cloth imported; and for carrying such Duties, together with the additional Duties granted in this Session of Parliament upon the Importation of Bast, or Straw, Chip, Cane, and Horsehair Hats and Bonnets, and certain Materials for making the same, to the Sinking Fund. (Repealed by Statute Law Revision Act 1867 (30 & 31 Vict. c. 59))
Sheriffs, etc. Act 1766 (repealed)	7 Geo. 3. c. 29	20 May 1767
An Act for explaining, an Act, made in the Twenty-ninth Year of the Reign of Queen Elizabeth, (Note: Sheriff's Poundage, etc. Act 1586 (29 Eliz. 1. c. 4)) to prevent Extortion in Sheriffs, Under Sheriffs, and Bailiffs of Franchises or Liberties, in Cases of Execution. (Repealed by Statute Law Revision Act 1867 (30 & 31 Vict. c. 59))
Importation (No. 8) Act 1766 (repealed)	7 Geo. 3. c. 30	20 May 1767
An Act for allowing the Free Importation of Rice, Sago Powder, and Vermicelli, into this Kingdom from His Majesty's Colonies in North America, for a limited Time. (Repealed by Statute Law Revision Act 1867 (30 & 31 Vict. c. 59))
Indemnity (No. 4) Act 1766 (repealed)	7 Geo. 3. c. 31	29 June 1767
An Act to indemnify such Persons as have omitted to qualify themselves for Offices and Employments; and to indemnify Justices of the Peace, Deputy Lieutenants, and Officers of the Militia, or others who have omitted to register or deliver in their Qualifications within the Time limited by Law, and for giving further Time for those Purposes; and to indemnify Members and Officers, in Cities, Corporations, and Borough Towns, whose Admissions have been omitted to be stamped according to Law, or, having been stamped, have been lost or mislaid; and for allowing them Time to provide Admissions duly stamped; and to give further Time to such Persons as have omitted to make and file Affidavits of the Execution of Indentures of Clerks to Attornies and Solicitors. (Repealed by Statute Law Revision Act 1867 (30 & 31 Vict. c. 59))
Old Palace Yard Act 1766	7 Geo. 3. c. 32	29 June 1767
An Act for applying the Money granted in this Session of Parliament, for carrying on an additional building, for a more commodious Passage to the House Commons, from Saint Margaret’s Lane and Old Palace Yard.
Taxation Act 1766 (repealed)	7 Geo. 3. c. 33	29 June 1767
An Act to enforce, in that Part of Great Britain called Scotland, the Execution of an Act of the last Session of Parliament, intituled, "An Act for repealing the several Duties upon Houses, Windows, and Lights; and for granting to His Majesty other Duties upon Houses, Windows, and Lights; and for explaining the said Act." (Note: House and Window Duties Act 1766 (6 Geo. 3. c. 38)) (Repealed by Statute Law Revision Act 1867 (30 & 31 Vict. c. 59))
Papists Act 1766 (repealed)	7 Geo. 3. c. 34	29 June 1767
An Act for allowing further Time for Enrolment of Deeds and Wills made by Papists; and for Relief of Protestant Purchasers. (Repealed by Statute Law Revision Act 1867 (30 & 31 Vict. c. 59))
Continuance of Laws (No. 2) Act 1766 (repealed)	7 Geo. 3. c. 35	29 June 1767
An Act to continue several Laws therein mentioned, relating to the clandestine Running of Uncustomed Goods, and preventing Frauds relating to the Customs; to prevent the clandestine Running of Goods, and the Danger of Infection thereby to the granting Liberty to carry Rice from His Majesty’s Provinces of Carolina and Georgia in America directly to any Part of Europe Southward of Cape Finisterre, in Ships built and navigated according to Law; and to the prohibiting the Importation of Books reprinted Abroad, and first composed, written, and printed, in Great Britain. (Repealed by Statute Law Revision Act 1867 (30 & 31 Vict. c. 59))
Importation, etc. Act 1766 (repealed)	7 Geo. 3. c. 36	29 June 1767
An Act to continue so much of an Act made in the Thirty-third Year of the Reign of His late Majesty, (Note: Continuance of Laws Act 1759 (33 Geo. 2. c. 16)) as relates to the free Importation of Cochineal and Indico; and for allowing the Bounties granted by any Acts of Parliament now in Being, upon the Exportation of Corn and Malt declared or made for Exportation, and Barley steeped and entered at the Excise Office to be made into Malt for Exportation, before a limited Time. (Repealed by Statute Law Revision Act 1867 (30 & 31 Vict. c. 59))
Thames Embankment Act 1766	7 Geo. 3. c. 37	29 June 1767
An Act for compleating the Bridge cross the River Thames, from Black Fryars in the City of London, to the opposite Side in the County of Surrey, and the Avenues thereto on the London Side; for redeeming the Tolls on the said Bridge, and on London Bridge; for rebuilding the Goal of Newgate in the said City; for repairing The Royal Exchange within the same; for embanking Part of the North Side of the said River, within certain Limits; and for further continuing, towards those Purposes, the Imposition of Six Pence per Chaldron, or Ton, of Coals and Culm imported into the Port of the said City, established by an Act of the Fifth and Sixth Years of the Reign of King William and Queen Mary; (Note: Taxation (No. 5) Act 1694 (5 & 6 Will. & Mar. c. 18)) and also for carrying on the new Pavements in the City and Liberties of Westminster, and Parishes adjacent; and in the Town and Borough of Southwark; and for other Purposes therein mentioned.
Engraving Copyright Act 1766 (repealed)	7 Geo. 3. c. 38	29 June 1767
An Act to amend and render more effectual an Act made in the Eighth Year of the Reign of King George the Second, (Note: Engraving Copyright Act 1734 (8 Geo. 2. c. 13)) for Encouragement of the Arts of Designing, Engraving, and Etching, Historical and other Prints; and for vesting in, and securing to, Jane Hogarth, (Note: Jane Hogarth, widow of William Hogarth.) Widow, the Property in certain Prints. (Repealed by Copyright Act 1911 (1 & 2 Geo. 5. c. 46))
Poor Act 1766 (repealed)	7 Geo. 3. c. 39	29 June 1767
An Act for the better Regulation of the Parish Poor Children of the several Parishes therein mentioned, within the Bills of Mortality. (Repealed by Poor Law Amendment Act 1844 (7 & 8 Vict. c. 101))
Turnpike Roads Act 1766 (repealed)	7 Geo. 3. c. 40	29 June 1767
An Act to explain, amend, and reduce into one Act of Parliament, the General Laws now in Being, for regulating the Turnpike Roads of this Kingdom; and for other Purposes therein mentioned. (Repealed by Turnpike Roads Act 1773 (13 Geo. 3. c. 84))
Commissioners of Customs Act 1766 (repealed)	7 Geo. 3. c. 41	29 June 1767
An Act to enable His Majesty to put the Customs and other Duties in the British Dominions in America, and the Execution of the Laws relating to Trade there, under the Management of Commissioners, to be appointed for that Purpose, and to be resident in the said Dominions. (Repealed by Customs Law Repeal Act 1825 (6 Geo. 4. c. 105))
Highways (No. 2) Act 1766 (repealed)	7 Geo. 3. c. 42	29 June 1767
An Act to explain, amend, and reduce into one Act of Parliament, the several Statutes now in Being, for the Amendment and Preservation of the publick Highways of this Kingdom; and for other Purposes therein mentioned. (Repealed by Highways Act 1773 (13 Geo. 3. c. 78))
Importation (No. 9) Act 1766 (repealed)	7 Geo. 3. c. 43	29 June 1767
An Act to amend and enforce the Acts of the Eighteenth, (Note: Cambrics Act 1744 (18 Geo. 2. c. 36)) Twenty-first, (Note: Cambrics Act 1747 (21 Geo. 2. c. 26)) and Thirty-second (Note: Importation (No. 3) Act 1758 (32 Geo. 2. c. 32)) Years of the Reign of His late Majesty King George the Second, for the more effectual preventing the fraudulent Importation and Wearing of Cambricks and French Lawns. (Repealed by Customs Law Repeal Act 1825 (6 Geo. 4. c. 105))
Stamps (No. 2) Act 1766 (repealed)	7 Geo. 3. c. 44	29 June 1767
An Act for altering the Stamp Duties upon Policies of Assurance; and for reducing the Allowance to be made in respect of the Prompt Payment of the Stamp Duties on Licenses for retailing Beer, Ale, and other Exciseable Liquors; and for explaining and amending several Acts, of Parliament relating to Hackney Coaches and Chairs. (Repealed by Inland Revenue Repeal Act 1870 (33 & 34 Vict. c. 99))
Customs (No. 4) Act 1766 (repealed)	7 Geo. 3. c. 45	29 June 1767
An Act for encouraging and regulating the Trade and Manufactures of the Isle of Man; and for the more easy Supply of the Inhabitants these with a certain Quantity of Wheat, Barley, Oats, Meal, and Flour, authorized by an Act made in this Session (Note: Importation and Exportation (No. 6) Act 1766 (7 Geo. 3. c. 3)) to be transported to the said Island. (Repealed by Customs Law Repeal Act 1825 (6 Geo. 4. c. 105))
Duties on Tea, etc. (American Plantations) Act 1766 or the Revenue Act 1767 or the Townshend Revenue Act or the Townshend Duties Act or the Tariff Act 1767 (repealed)	7 Geo. 3. c. 46	29 June 1767
An Act for granting certain Duties in the British Colonies and Plantations in America; for allowing a Drawback of the Duties of Customs upon the Exportation, from this Kingdom, of Coffee and Cocoa Nuts, of the Produce of the said Colonies or Plantations; for discontinuing the Drawbacks payable on China Earthen Ware exported to America; and for more effectually preventing the clandestine Running of Goods in the said Colonies and Plantations. (Repealed by Statute Law Revision Act 1867 (30 & 31 Vict. c. 59))
Duties (Logwood, etc.) Act 1766 (repealed)	7 Geo. 3. c. 47	29 June 1767
An Act for discontinuing the Duties on Logwood exported; for taking off the Duties on Succus Liquoritiæ imported, and for granting other Duties in Lieu thereof; for explaining such Parts of Two Acts made in the Tenth (Note: Taxation Act 1711 (10 Ann. c. 18)) and Twelfth (Note: Taxation (No. 3) Act 1713 (13 Ann. c. 22)) Years of the Reign of Queen Anne, as relate to certain Duties on Silks printed, painted, or stained, in Great Britain; for granting a Duty upon the Exportation of such Rice as shall have been imported Duty free, in Pursuance of an Act made in this Session of Parliament; (Note: Importation (No. 8) Act 1766 (7 Geo. 3. c. 30)) and for more effectually preventing the Wear of Foreign Lace and Needle-work, which are prohibited to be imported into this Kingdom. (Repealed by Statute Law Revision Act 1867 (30 & 31 Vict. c. 59))

=== Private acts ===
Short title	Citation	Royal assent
Long title
Enabling James Oswald, James Grenville, and Daniel Barre to take, in Great Britain the oaths of office of Vice Treasurer, Receiver General and Paymaster General of Ireland, and qualifying them for the enjoyment of the said offices.	7 Geo. 3. c. 1 Pr.	16 December 1766
An Act to enable the Right Honourable James Oswald, the Right Honourable James Grenville, and the Right Honourable Isaac Barré, to take, in Great Britain, the Oath of Office, as Vice Treasurer, and Receiver General, and Paymaster General, of all His Majesty‘s Revenues in the Kingdom of Ireland, and to qualify themselves for the Enjoyment of the said Offices.
Burrowes' Naturalization Act 1766	7 Geo. 3. c. 2 Pr.	16 December 1766
An Act for naturalizing Mary Anne Amelie Burrowes.
Van Teylingen's Naturalization Act 1766	7 Geo. 3. c. 3 Pr.	16 December 1766
An Act for naturalizing Christian Van Teylingen.
Naturalization of Lewis Agassiz, John Schutz, Philip Krauter, Joshua Rougemont, Ferdinand De Mierre and Christian Klein.	7 Geo. 3. c. 4 Pr.	16 December 1766
An Act for naturalizing Lewis Agassiz, John Samuel Schutz, Philip David Krauter, Joshua Rougemont, Ferdinand de Mierre, and Christian Godfrey Klein.
Dashwood's Estate Act 1766	7 Geo. 3. c. 5 Pr.	27 February 1767
An Act for making more effectual an Act, passed in the Third Year of His present Majesty’s Reign, intituled, "An Act for vesting Part of the settled Estates of Samuel Dashwood Esquire in Trustees, for raising Money to pay Debts and Encumbrances; and for providing an Equivalent or Compensation for the same to the Issue inheritable under his Marriage Settlement." (Note: Dashwood's Estate Act 1763 (3 Geo. 3. c. 38 Pr.))
Kencott Inclosure Act 1766	7 Geo. 3. c. 6 Pr.	27 February 1767
An Act for dividing and enclosing the Open Common Fields and other Commonable Grounds in the Parish of Kencott, in the County of Oxford.
Chesterton Inclosure Act 1766	7 Geo. 3. c. 7 Pr.	27 February 1767
An Act for dividing and enclosing certain Open and Common Fields, Common Pastures, Common Meadows, Common Grounds, and Commonable Lands, lying within the Manor of Chesterton, in the County of Oxford.
Sandford Inclosure Act 1766	7 Geo. 3. c. 8 Pr.	27 February 1767
An Act for dividing and enclosing certain Open and Common Fields and Commonable Lands in the Parish of Sandford, in the County of Oxford.
Carlisle and Cummersdale Moor Inclosure Act 1766	7 Geo. 3. c. 9 Pr.	27 February 1767
An Act for dividing and enclosing a certain Common Moor called Carlisle and Cummersdale Moor, in the County of Cumberland.
Halton East Inclosure Act 1766	7 Geo. 3. c. 10 Pr.	27 February 1767
An Act for dividing and enclosing Halton Green, and for disposing of other Grounds within the Township of Halton East, in the Parish of Skipton, in the County of York.
Ingleton Inclosure Act 1766	7 Geo. 3. c. 11 Pr.	27 February 1767
An Act for dividing, allotting, and enclosing, such Part of certain Commons and Waste Grounds, called Bentham Moor, as lieth within the Township of Ingleton, in the West Riding of the County of York.
Old or Would (Northamptonshire) Inclosure Act 1766	7 Geo. 3. c. 12 Pr.	27 February 1767
An Act for dividing and enclosing the Open and Common Fields, Common Meadows, Common Pastures, Common Grounds, Lanes, and Waste Grounds, within the Manor and Parish of Old, otherwise Would, in the County of Northampton.
Chorley Inclosure Act 1766	7 Geo. 3. c. 13 Pr.	27 February 1767
An Act for dividing and enclosing several Commons, or Waste Grounds, within the Manor of Chorley, in the County Palatine of Lancaster.
Yaxley Inclosure Act 1766	7 Geo. 3. c. 14 Pr.	27 February 1767
An Act for dividing and enclosing the Open Fields, Meadows, Common Pastures, and Waste Grounds, and also the Marsh and Fenny Grounds, in the Manor and Parish of Yaxley, in the County of Huntingdon.
Scott's Divorce Act 1766	7 Geo. 3. c. 15 Pr.	27 February 1767
An Act to dissolve the Marriage of John Stott Esquire with Jane Stott his now Wife; and to enable him to marry again; and for other Purposes therein mentioned.
Delves' Name Act 1766	7 Geo. 3. c. 16 Pr.	27 February 1767
An Act to enable Sir Thomas Delves Baronet and his Heirs Male to take the Name of Broughton.
Hotchkis's Name Act 1766	7 Geo. 3. c. 17 Pr.	27 February 1767
An Act to enable Thomas Hotchkis to take the Surname and Arms of Littler, pursuant to the Will of Thomas Littler, deceased.
Aylon's Name Act 1766	7 Geo. 3. c. 18 Pr.	27 February 1767
An Act to enable Sarah Aylon Spinster to take and use the Surname and Arms of Tyrrell.
Valltravers' Naturalization Act 1766	7 Geo. 3. c. 19 Pr.	27 February 1767
An Act for naturalizing John Rodolph Valtravers.
Van Denbergh's Naturalization Act 1766	7 Geo. 3. c. 20 Pr.	27 February 1767
An Act for naturalizing Chrissofel Vanden Bergh, an Infant.
Mandrot's Naturalization Act 1766	7 Geo. 3. c. 21 Pr.	27 February 1767
An Act for naturalizing Samuel Mandrot.
Beckman's Naturalization Act 1766	7 Geo. 3. c. 22 Pr.	27 February 1767
An Act for naturalizing Nicolas Francis Beckman.
Van Teylingen's Naturalization Act 1766	7 Geo. 3. c. 23 Pr.	27 February 1767
An Act for naturalizing Theodore Van Teylmgen, an Infant.
Naturalization of John Baumgartner and Amable Doct.	7 Geo. 3. c. 24 Pr.	27 February 1767
An Act for naturalizing John Lewis Baumgartner and Amable Doct.
Dighton's Estate Act 1766	7 Geo. 3. c. 25 Pr.	23 March 1767
An Act for vesting the Estate of James Lucy Dighton, an Infant, in the Parish of Sherborne, in the County of Oxford, in Trustees, to be sold; and for applying the Purchase-money for discharging Encumbrances affecting the same, pursuant to the Directions of the Court of Chancery.

=== Sources ===
- "7 George III - 1766-7". The Statutes at Large. Vol. 27. Cambridge, Printed by Joseph Bentham. 1762 – via Internet Archive.
- "7 George III - 1766-7". The Statutes at Large. Vol. 27. 1767 – via Google Books.
- "7 George III - 1766-7". The Statutes at Large. Vol. 27. 1762 – via Internet Archive.
- Journals of the House of Commons. Vol. 31. London: His Majesty's Stationery Office. 1803. pp. 3–418 – via Google Books.
- Chronological Table of and Index to the Statutes. Vol. 1: To the End of the Session 59 Vict. Sess. 2 (1895) (13th ed.). London: Her Majesty's Stationery Office. 1896. pp. 124–125 – via Google Books.

== See also ==
- List of acts of the Parliament of Great Britain
