= Free Port Act 1766 =

Act of the Parliament of Great Britain

Free Ports, West Indies, etc. Act 1766
- Act of Parliament
- Parliament of Great Britain
- Long title: An Act for opening and establishing certain Ports in the Islands of Jamaica and Dominica, for the more free Importation and Exportation of certain Goods and Merchandizes; for granting certain Duties, to defray the Expenses of opening, maintaining, securing, and improving, much Ports; for ascertaining the Duties to be paid upon the Importation of Goods from the Said Island of Dominica into this Kingdom; and for securing the Duties upon Goods imported from the Said Island into any other British Colony.
- Citation: 6 Geo. 3. c. 49
- Territorial extent: Great Britain

Dates
- Royal assent: 6 June 1766
- Commencement: 1 November 1766 (Note: Start of session.)
- Repealed: 15 July 1867
Other legislation
Amended by	Free Ports (Jamaica) Act; Continuance of Laws Act 1781
Repealed by	Statute Law Revision Act 1867

Status: Repealed

Text of statute as originally enacted

The British Free Port Act 1766 (6 Geo. 3. c. 49) was an act of the Parliament of the United Kingdom that opened six British ports in the West Indies to foreign merchants, and enabled English colonists to conduct trade with French and Spanish colonies.

The act was passed in 1766 following the Seven Years’ War and prior to the American Revolution. The act was a modified version of one in use by the French and Dutch.

== Background ==
Prior to 1766, the Navigation Acts of 1651 and 1660 regulated British trade, restricting colonial trade to England and limiting foreign imports to promote the interests of the British Empire.

As English colonists continued to settle in the Americas, the British West Indies became unable to produce sufficient quantities of commodities needed in other parts of the Atlantic. This included products such as sugar, raw cotton, and molasses. To address these shortages, the Free Port Act enabled foreign supplies to enter the British system. Four ports were approved in Jamaica, along with two ports in Dominica.

== Subsequent developments ==
The act as relates "to the opening and establishing certain Free Ports in the Island of Jamaica" was continued from the expiration of those enactments until the end of the next session of parliament after 1 November 1780 by section 1 of the Free Ports (Jamaica) Act 1774 (14 Geo. 3. c. 41).

The act as relates "to the opening and establishing certain Free Ports in the Island of Jamaica" was continued from the expiration of those enactments until the end of the next session of parliament after 1 November 1787 by section 1 of the Continuance of Laws Act 1781 (21 Geo. 3. c. 29).

The whole act was repealed by section 1 of, and the schedule to, the Statute Law Revision Act 1867 (30 & 31 Vict. c. 59).
