= Customs Law Repeal Act 1825 =

Act of the Parliament of the United Kingdom

- Act of Parliament
- Parliament of the United Kingdom
- Long title: An Act to repeal the several Laws relating to the Customs.
- Citation: 6 Geo. 4. c. 105
- Introduced by: Robert Wilmot-Horton MP (Commons)
- Territorial extent: United Kingdom

Dates
- Royal assent: 5 July 1825
- Commencement: 5 July 1825 (Note: The Acts of Parliament (Commencement) Act 1793.)
- Repealed: 5 August 1873
Other legislation
Amends	See § Repealed enactments
Repeals/revokes	See § Repealed enactments
Amended by	Customs Act 1826
Repealed by	Statute Law Revision Act 1873
Relates to	Customs, etc. Act 1825; Customs, etc. (No. 2) Act 1825; Customs, etc. (No. 3) Act 1825; Customs, etc. (No. 4) Act 1825; Customs, etc. (No. 5) Act 1825; Customs, etc. (No. 6) Act 1825; Customs, etc. (No. 7) Act 1825; Customs, etc. (No. 8) Act 1825; Customs, etc. (No. 9) Act 1825; Customs, etc. (No. 10) Act 1825; Customs Act 2006; Excise Management Act 1827; Customs (Repeal) Act 1833; Customs (Repeal) Act 1845; Customs Consolidation Act 1853; Passenger Vessels Act 1825; Merchant Shipping Repeal Act 1854; Supplemental Customs Consolidation Act 1855; Customs Consolidation Act 1876

Status: Repealed

History of passage through Parliament

Text of statute as originally enacted

The Customs Law Repeal Act 1825 (6 Geo. 4. c. 105), also known as the Customs' Laws' Repeal Act 1825, the Customs Repeal Act 1825 or the Customs Act 1825, was an act of the Parliament of the United Kingdom that repealed various enactments relating to customs in the United Kingdom from 1558 to 1823.

== Background ==
In the United Kingdom, acts of Parliament remain in force until expressly repealed. Blackstone's Commentaries on the Laws of England, published in the late 18th century, raised questions about the system and structure of the common law and the poor drafting and disorder of the existing statute book.

In 1806 the Commission on Public Records passed a resolution requesting the production of a report on the best mode of reducing the volume of the statute book. From 1810 to 1825, The Statutes of the Realm was published, providing for the first time the authoritative collection of acts.

By the early 19th century, British customs law, relating to trade, navigation, the import and export of goods, and the collection of customs revenue, had become increasingly intricate and difficult to navigate due to the large number of acts passed that had accumulated over many years. This complexity posed challenges for both commerce and law enforcement. The preamble of the act acknowledged that the existing system had become an impediment to trade and the "Ends of Justice".

In 1810, the Lords of the Treasury asked Nicholas Jickling to produce a Digest of the Laws of the Customs, which was published in 1815, numbering 1,375 pages from the earliest period to 53 Geo. 3. This Digest was continuously published to bring the state of the law up to date to the end of every session. In 1814, the Commission of Public Records published their 14th Report, recommending consolidation of the statute law.

In 1822, the Navigation and Commerce Act 1822 (3 Geo. 4. c. 43) was passed to encourage shipping and navigation. The Repeal of Acts Concerning Importation Act 1822 (c. 41) and the Repeal of Acts Concerning Importation (No. 2) Act 1822 ( c. 42) were passed at the same time to repealed related inconsistent or obsolete enactments.

In 1823, the Customs and Excise Act 1823 (4 Geo. 4. c. 23) was passed, which consolidated the several Boards of Customs, and also, the several Boards of Excise across the United Kingdom.

By a letter dated 9 August 1823, Secretary to the Treasury, John Charles Herries MP, asked J. D. Hume, Controller of the Port of London, to "undertake the preparation of a general law, or set of laws, for the consolidation of the customs of the United Kingdom".

The original plan for the consolidation was outlined in a letter dated November 18, 1824, from Mr. Herries, Secretary of the Treasury, to the Customs Commissioners, proposing: The plan proposed a two-pronged approach:

1. Specific repeal: Identifying and listing specific acts and parts of acts to be repealed, ensuring their removal from the statute book.
2. General description: Implementing a general repeal clause to address any potential omissions and provide legal clarity.

Despite the intention to create a new legal code that would supersede all previous customs laws, with a declaration that no law predating the new code would remain in force, the general repeal clause was withdrawn, the operation of the repeal of the enumerated acts was postponed for six months and full implementation of the new consolidated code was deferred to a future date.

On 15 April 1825, the Committee on Customs and Excise Consolidation Acts reported and resolved that it was "expedient to repeal the several Laws relating to the Customs now in force; and to consolidate the various enactments therein contained."

In 1825, eleven customs bills were proposed to consolidate to all practical purposes the whole statute law of the customs by repealing the numerous existing customs statutes and replace them with new, more clearly written laws. The bills simplified tariff schedules, to make it easier for traders to understand duties, revised penalties for customs offences to ensure fair and consistent enforcement and introduced standardised procedures for customs declarations, to reduce administrative burdens and increase efficiency at ports.

== Passage ==
Leave to bring in the Customs Laws Repeal Bill to the House of Commons was granted on 15 April 1825 to the Under-Secretary of State for War and the Colonies, Robert Wilmot-Horton MP, the Secretary to the Treasury, John Charles Herries MP, the Chancellor of the Exchequer, Frederick John Robinson MP, Attorney General, John Singleton Copley MP and the Solicitor General, Sir Charles Wetherell MP. The bill had its first reading in the House of Commons on 22 April 1825, introduced by Robert Wilmot-Horton MP. The bill had its second reading in the House of Commons on 25 April 1825 and was committed to a committee of the whole house, which met and reported on 30 April 1825, with amendments. The amended bill had its third reading in the House of Commons on 24 June 1825 and passed, without amendments.

The amended bill, referred to as the Customs Repeal Bill, had its first reading in the House of Lords on 27 June 1825. The bill had its second reading in the House of Lords on 28 June 1825 and was committed to a committee of the whole house, which met and reported on 29 June 1825, without amendments. The bill had its third reading in the House of Lords on 30 June 1825 and passed, without amendments.

The bill was granted royal assent on 5 July 1825.

== Subsequent developments ==
In 1825, eleven customs acts were passed to amend and consolidate the customs law:

- Customs, etc. Act 1825 (6 Geo. 4. c. 106)
- Customs, etc. (No. 2) Act 1825 (6 Geo. 4. c. 107)
- Customs, etc. (No. 3) Act 1825 (6 Geo. 4. c. 108)
- Customs, etc. (No. 4) Act 1825 (6 Geo. 4. c. 109)
- Customs, etc. (No. 5) Act 1825 (6 Geo. 4. c. 110)
- Customs, etc. (No. 6) Act 1825 (6 Geo. 4. c. 111)
- Customs, etc. (No. 7) Act 1825 (6 Geo. 4. c. 112)
- Customs, etc. (No. 8) Act 1825 (6 Geo. 4. c. 113)
- Customs, etc. (No. 9) Act 1825 (6 Geo. 4. c. 114)
- Customs, etc. (No. 10) Act 1825 (6 Geo. 4. c. 115)
- Passenger Vessels Act 1825 (6 Geo. 4 c. 116)

The Customs Act 1826 (7 Geo. 4. c. 48) reversed the repeal of several acts, including:

- Trade of Sugar Colonies Act 1732 (6 Geo. 2. c. 13)
- Duties on Tea, etc. (American Plantations) Act 1766 (7 Geo. 3. c. 46)
- Parliamentary Elections (Ireland) Act 1803 (43 Geo. 3. c. 25)
- Merchant Seamen, etc. Act 1823 (4 Geo. 4. c. 25)
- Countervening Duties of Excise Act 1823 (4 Geo. 4. c. 30)

In 1827, the Excise Management Act 1827 (7 & 8 Geo. 4. c. 53) was passed, which consolidated enactments relating to the collection and management of customs.

In 1833, eleven customs acts were passed to further amend and consolidate the customs law:

- Customs, etc. Act 1833 (3 & 4 Will. 4. c. 51)
- Customs, etc. (No. 2) Act 1833 (3 & 4 Will. 4. c. 52)
- Customs, etc. (No. 3) Act 1833 (3 & 4 Will. 4. c. 53)
- Customs, etc. (No. 4) Act 1833 (3 & 4 Will. 4. c. 54)
- Customs, etc. (No. 5) Act 1833 (3 & 4 Will. 4. c. 55)
- Customs, etc. (No. 6) Act 1833 (3 & 4 Will. 4. c. 56)
- Customs, etc. (No. 7) Act 1833 (3 & 4 Will. 4. c. 57)
- Customs, etc. (No. 8) Act 1833 (3 & 4 Will. 4. c. 58)
- Customs, etc. (No. 9) Act 1833 (3 & 4 Will. 4. c. 59)
- Customs, etc. (No. 10) Act 1833 (3 & 4 Will. 4. c. 60)
- Customs, etc. (No. 11) Act 1833 (3 & 4 Will. 4. c. 61)

In 1845, 10 customs acts were passed to further amend and consolidate the customs law:

- Commissioners of Customs Act 1845 (8 & 9 Vict. c. 85)
- Customs (No. 3) Act 1845 (8 & 9 Vict. c. 86)
- Prevention of Smuggling Act 1845 (8 & 9 Vict. c. 87)
- Shipping, etc. Act 1845 (8 & 9 Vict. c. 89)
- Registering of British Vessels Act 1845 (8 & 9 Vict. c. 90)
- Duties of Customs Act 1845 (8 & 9 Vict. c. 91)
- Warehousing of Goods Act 1845 (8 & 9 Vict. c. 92)
- Customs (No. 4) Act 1845 (8 & 9 Vict. c. 93)
- Trade of British Possessions Act 1845 (8 & 9 Vict. c. 94)
- Isle of Man Trade Act 1845 (8 & 9 Vict. c. 95)

In 1845, the Customs (Repeal) Act 1845 (8 & 9 Vict. c. 84) was passed to repeal 26 related enactments.

In 1853, Customs Consolidation Act 1853 (16 & 17 Vict. c. 107) was passed to consolidate the customs law.

== Repeal ==
The whole act was repealed by section 1 of, and the schedule to, the Statute Law Revision Act 1873 (36 & 37 Vict. c. 91), which came into force on 5 August 1873.

The qualified terms of the repeal were criticised by William Rogers, a member of the Board for the Revision of the Statute Law, and led to several acts being repealed by later Statute Law Revision Acts, including:

- Statute Law Revision Act 1861 (24 & 25 Vict. c. 101)
- Statute Law Revision Act 1863 (6 & 27 Vict. c. 125)
- Statute Law Revision Act 1867 (30 & 31 Vict. c. 59)
- Statute Law Revision Act 1871 (34 & 35 Vict. c. 116)
- Statute Law Revision Act 1872 (35 & 36 Vict. c. 63)
- Statute Law Revision Act 1872 (No. 2) (35 & 36 Vict. c. 97)
- Statute Law Revision Act 1873 (36 & 37 Vict. c. 91)

== Repealed enactments ==
Section 444 of the act repealed 443 enactments, listed in sections 2–444 of the act. Section 444 of the act included exceptions for:

1. Any repeals of former acts contained within the acts being repealed, which remain in effect.
2. Arrears of duties or drawbacks that had become due and payable prior to this act.
3. Any penalty or forfeiture which had been incurred under the previous acts.
4. Any parts of the repealed acts relating to Ireland that create or regulate jurisdiction for the trial of offences committed there.

Section 445 of the act stipulated that the legislation in question can be modified, changed, or completely repealed through subsequent acts passed within the same parliamentary session, providing flexibility for rapid adjustments if deemed necessary.

Citation	Short title	Title	Extent of repeal
17 Ric. 2. c. 5	Revenue officers	So much of an Act passed in the Seventeenth Year of the Reign of King Richard the Second, as ordains, that no Searcher, Gauger of Wines, Aulneger, Finder nor Weigher of Wools or other Merchandizes, Collector of Customs or Subsidies whatsoever, or Comptroller, shall have Estate in his Office for Term of life or of Years, but that the said Offices shall remain in the King's Hands, under the Governance of the Treasurer for the Time being, with the Assent of the Council when need is; and if any Charters or Letters Patent be made to the contrary, they shall be clearly admitted void and of none effect.	The whole act.
1 Hen. 4. c. 13	N/A	So much of a Statute passed in the First Year of the Reign of King Henry the Fourth, as accords, that Customers and Comptrollers in every Port of England shall be resident upon their Office in their proper Persons, without making any Deputy in.	The whole act. (Note: This act was repealed in full for England and Wales by the Statute Law Revision Act 1863 and for Ireland by the Statute Law (Ireland) Revision Act 1872. The notes for the Statute Law Revision Act 1863 state "Repealed in part expressly, and as to residue virtually, by 6 Geo. 4. c. 105.")
4 Hen. 4. c. 20	Customs	So much of a Statute passed in the Fourth Year of the Reign of King Henry the Fourth, as ordains, that Customers and Comptrollers in every Part of England shall abide upon their Offices in their proper Persons, without making any Deputy or Lieutenant in their Name; and that they shall be sworn to be same from time to time; that the Lieutenant of the King's Chief Butler and the Customer shall be resident in the same Manner; and that every Customer, upon yielding of his Account, shall be sworn by his Oath in manner of all Manner of Profits and Commodities for the Payment of any Assignment.	The whole act.
4 Hen. 4. c. 21	Customs	So much of an Act made in the Fourth Year of the Reign of King Henry the Fourth, as ordains, that the Searcher in every Port of England shall not let their Office to farm, nor occupy by Deputy, nor take of Masters of Ships for their Office of Searching any Money for their Welcome or Farewell, nor any other Thing for the same, and that no Searcher be Host to any Merchant or Mariner.	The whole act.
11 Hen. 4. c. 2	Customers	So much of an Act passed in the Eleventh Year of the Reign of King Henry the Fourth, as enacts, that no Man who holdeth a Common Hostery in any City or Borough of England, shall be a Customer, Comptroller, Finder or Searcher of the King.	The whole act.
13 Hen. 4. c. 5	Customers	So much of an Act passed in the Thirteenth Year of the Reign of King Henry the Fourth, as ordaining, that Customers and Comptrollers, Gaugers of Wines and Searchers, through the Realm, shall be constantly resident upon their Offices.	Confirmation of 4 Hen. 4. c. 20. Residue. (Note: The rest of the Act (being the confirmation of 1 Hen. 4. c. 13) was repealed for England and Wales by the Statute Law Revision Act 1863 and for Ireland by the Statute Law (Ireland) Revision Act 1872.)
3 Hen. 6. c. 3	Customs	So much of an Act passed in the Sixth Year of the Reign of King Henry the Sixth, as enacts, that if any Customer, Collector or Comptroller of the King's Customs of Cockets of Cloths, of Subsidies of Tonnage or Poundage, shall be convicted or attainted of false concealing of any Custom or Subsidy duly entered, paid by any Merchant, that then the said Customer, Collector or Comptroller shall lose and forfeit Treble Value of the Merchandizes, and make Fine and Ransom.	The whole act.
31 Hen. 6. c. 5	N/A	So much of an Act passed in the Eleventh Year of the Reign of King Henry the Sixth, as ordains, that of Letters Patent of any of the Offices of Searcher, Finder, Weigher, Gager or Comptroller, shall be made but by Warrant of Bill signed by the Treasurer of England for the time being, sent by him into the Chancery.	The whole act. (Note: This act was repealed in whole for England and Wales by the Statute Law Revision Act 1863 and for Ireland by the Statute Law (Ireland) Revision Act 1872. The Notes for the Statute Law Revision Act 1863 state "Spent in part. Repealed in part expressly and in other part virtually by 6 Geo. 4. c. 105. Virtually repealed in part by 11 (11 & 12 in Ruffhead's Edition) Will. 3. c. 20. s. 2. (abolishing Aulnage duties). Residue (Gauger of Wines) obsolete or unnecessary.")
5 & 6 Edw. 6. c. 16	Sale of Offices Act 1551	An Act passed in the Sixth Year of the Reign of Edward the Sixth, against buying and selling of Offices.	So far as regards the Revenue of Customs or Offices in the Service of the Customs.
1 Eliz. 1. c. 11	Customs Act 1558	An Act passed in the First Year of the Reign of Queen Elizabeth, intituled An Act limiting the Time for laying on Land Merchandize from beyond the Seas, and touching Customs for Sweet Wines.	The whole act.
5 Eliz. 1. c. 5	Maintenance of the Navy Act 1562	An Act passed in the Fifth Year of Queen Elizabeth, intituled An Act touching politic Constitutions for the Maintenance of the Navy.	As enacts, that it shall not be lawful to any Person or Persons to lade or carry any Fish, Victuals, or other Goods or Merchandizes from one Port or Creek of this Realm to another Port or Creek of the same, in any Ship, Vessel or Bottom, being not English Bottom, and whereof the most Part of the Mariners shall not be English. I.e., section 46
13 Eliz. 1. c. 4	Liability of Crown Accountants Act 1571	An Act passed in the Twenty seventh Year of the said Queen, intituled An Act for the better Explanation of an Act made in the Thirteenth Year of the Queens Majesty's Reign, intituled An Act to make Lands, Tenements, Goods and Chattels of Tellers, Receivers liable to the Payment of their Debts.	So much as makes the Lands, Tenements, Goods and Chattels of Receivers of His Majesty's Customs, liable to the Payment of their Debts due to the Crown. I.e., section 7.
27 Eliz. 1. c. 3	Lands of Crown Accountants Act 1584	An Act passed in the Twenty seventh Year of the said Queen, intituled An Act for the better Explanation of an Act made in the Thirteenth Year of the Queens Majesty's Reign, intituled An Act to make Lands, Tenements, Goods and Chattels of Tellers, Receivers liable to the Payment of their Debts.	So much as makes the Lands, Tenements, Goods and Chattels of Receivers of His Majesty's Customs, liable to the Payment of their Debts due to the Crown. I.e., sections 2 to 6.
7 Jas. 1. c. 14	Horns Act 1609	An Act passed in the Seventh Year of the Reign of King James the Second, as enacts that no Person or Persons whatsoever shall send English Horns unwrought over the Sea.	As remains unrepealed, by the Measure of the said Act.
12 Cha. 2. c. 4	Subsidy Act 1660	An Act passed in the Twelfth Year of the Reign of King Charles the Second, intituled A Subsidy granted to the King of Tonnage and Poundage, and other Sums of Money payable upon Merchandize exported and imported.	As remains unrepealed.
12 Cha. 2. c. 18	Navigation Act 1660	An Act made in the Twelfth Year of the Reign of King Charles the Second, intituled An Act for the encouraging and increasing of Shipping and Navigation.	As remains unrepealed.
12 Cha. 2. c. 19	Customs Act 1660	An Act passed in the Twelfth Year of the Reign of King Charles the Second, intituled An Act to prevent Frauds and Concealments of His Majesty's Customs and Subsidies.	The whole act.
13 & 14 Cha. 2. c. 7	Exportation of Leather Act 1662	An Act passed in the Thirteenth and Fourteenth Years of King Charles the Second, intituled An Act to prevent the Exportation of Leather and Raw Hides out of the Kingdom of England.	As regards the Exportation of Leather and Hides out of the Kingdom.
13 & 14 Cha. 2. c. 11	Customs Act 1662	An Act passed in the Thirteenth and Fourteenth Years of the Reign of King Charles the Second, intituled An Act for preventing Frauds and regulating Abuses in His Majesty's Customs.	The whole act.
13 & 14 Cha. 2. c. 13	Foreign Bone-lace, etc. Act 1662	An Act passed in the Thirteenth and Fourteenth Years of the said Reign of King Charles the Second, intituled An Act for prohibiting the Exportation of Foreign Bone Lace, Cut Work, Embroidery, Fringe, Band-strings, Buttons and Needlework.	The whole act.
13 & 14 Cha. 2. c. 18	Wool Act 1662	An Act passed in the Thirteenth and Fourteenth Years of the said Reign, intituled An Act against importing Foreign Woad Cards, Wire or Iron Wire.	The whole act.
15 Cha. 2. c. 7	Encouragement of Trade Act 1663	An Act passed in the Fifteenth Year of the said Reign, intituled An Act for Encouragement of Trade.	The whole act. (Note: This act was repealed by Finance (1909-10) Act 1910.)
18 Cha. 2. c. 2	Importation Act 1666	An Act passed in the Eighteenth Year of the said Reign, intituled An Act against importing Cattle from Ireland, and other Parts beyond the Seas, and Fish taken by Foreigners.	The whole act.
22 & 23 Cha. 2. c. 26	Tobacco Planting and Plantation Trade Act 1670	An Act passed in the Twenty second and Twenty third Years of the Reign of King Charles the Second, intituled An Act to prevent the Planting of Tobacco in England, and for regulating the Plantation Trade.	As in any way relates to the Plantation Trade in His Majesty's Dominions.
32 Cha. 2. c. 2	Importation Act 1680	An Act passed in the Thirty second Year of the Reign of King Charles the Second, intituled An Act prohibiting the Importation of Cattle from Ireland.	The whole act.
1 Ja. 2. c. 8	Importing, etc., of Gunpowder, etc. Act 1685	An Act passed in the First Year of the Reign of King James the Second, intituled An Act against the Importation of Gunpowder, Arms and other Ammunition, and Utensils of War.	As to Importation. (Note: The act was repealed for England and Wales by the Statute Law Revision Act 1863 and for Ireland by the Statute Law (Ireland) Revision Act 1872.)
1 Ja. 2. c. 18	Ships Act 1685	An Act passed in the First Year of the Reign of King James the Second, intituled An Act passed in the An Act to encourage the building of Ships in England.	The whole act.
1 Will. & Mar. c. 32	Woollen Manufactures Act 1688	An Act passed in the First Year of the Reign of King William and Queen Mary, intituled An Act for the better preventing the Exportation of Wool, and encouraging the Woollen Manufactures of this Kingdom.	As directs that a Register be kept at the Custom House, London, of all Wool imported from Ireland, and of all Wool sent from one Port to another in this Kingdom.
4 & 5 Will. & Mar. c. 5	Importation Act 1692	An Act for prohibiting the Importation of all Foreign Hair Buttons.	The whole act.
4 & 5 Will. & Mar. c. 15	Taxation (No. 3) Act 1692	An Act passed in the Fourth and Fifth Years of the said Reign of King William and Queen Mary, intituled An Act for continuing certain Acts therein mentioned, and for charging several Joint Stocks.	As enacts, that all and every Person or Persons whatsoever, who by way of Insurance or otherwise shall undertake or agree to deliver any Goods or Merchandizes whatsoever, to be imported from Parts beyond the Seas, at any Port or Place whatsoever within this Kingdom of England, Dominion of Wales, or Town of Berwick upon Tweed, without paying the Customs and Duties that shall be due and payable for the same at such Importation, or to deliver any prohibited Goods whatsoever, or shall receive or take such prohibited Goods into his, her or their House or Warehouse, or other Place on Land, or such other Goods, before such Customs and Duties are paid, knowing thereof, shall for every such Offence forfeit and lose the Sum of Five hundred Pounds. I.e., sections 14, 15 and 1.
6 & 7 Will. & Mar. c. 1	Land Tax Act 1693	An Act for granting to their Majesties a Subsidy of Tonnage and Poundage, and other Sums of Money payable upon Merchandizes exported and imported.	Chief Baron of the Exchequer, or Master of the Rolls for the Time being, for the true and faithful Execution of the Trusts committed to their Charge;
6 & 7 Will. & Mar. c. 17	Coin Act 1694	An Act passed in the Sixth and Seventh Years of the Reign of King William and Queen Mary, intituled An Act for granting to His Majesty several additional Duties upon Coffee, Tea, Chocolate and Spices, towards Satisfaction of the Debts due for Transport Service for the Reduction of Ireland.	As enacts, that it shall and may be lawful for any Person or Persons to import into the Kingdom of England, Dominion of Wales, or Town of Berwick upon Tweed, Nutmegs, Cinnamon, Cloves, Mace and Tea, subject to the several Duties payable for the same, from any Parts beyond the Seas, in English Ships, whereof the Master and at least Three Fourth Parts of the Mariners are English, as Natives or such as are naturalized, so as Notice be first given to the Commissioners of His Majesty's Customs of the Quantity and Quality so intended to be imported, with the Name of the Ship and Master or Commander in which they are to be laden, and the Place into which they intend to import the same.
7 & 8 Will. 3. c. 20	Taxation (No. 4) Act 1695	An Act passed in the Seventh and Eighth Years of the Reign of King William the Third, intituled An Act for granting to His Majesty an additional Duty upon all French Goods and Merchandize.	So much as prohibits the Exportation of any Frame or Engine, or Part of the same, for making or knitting Worsted and Silk Stockings, Waistcoats, Gloves and other Wearing Apparel. I.e., section 8.
7 & 8 Will. 3. c. 22	Plantation Trade Act 1695	An Act passed in the Seventh and Eighth Years of the Reign of King William the Third, intituled An Act for preventing Frauds and regulating Abuses in the Plantation Trade.	So much as relates to the revenue of Customs.
7 & 8 Will. 3. c. 28	Wool Act 1695	An Act passed in the Seventh and Eighth Years of the Reign of King William the Third, intituled An Act for the more effectual preventing the Exportation of Wool, and for encouraging the Importation thereof from Ireland.	So much as directs an Account to be transmitted from Ireland to England, once in Six Months, of all Wool exported from thence, and that Certificates for landing of Wool be written upon Paper. I.e., section 6.
9 & 10 Will. 3. c. 13	Taxation (Coals and Culm) Act 1697	An Act passed in the Ninth and Tenth Years of the Reign of King William the Third, intituled An Act for granting to His Majesty several Duties upon Coals and Culm.	So much as in any way relates to the importation, Exportation, measuring, shipping or landing of Coals.
9 & 10 Will. 3. c. 23	Civil List Act 1697	An Act passed in the Ninth and Tenth Years of King William the Third, intituled An Act for granting to His Majesty a further Subsidy of Tonnage and Poundage towards raising the yearly Sum of Seven hundred thousand Pounds, for the Service of His Majesty's Household, and other Uses therein mentioned, during His Majesty's Life.	The whole act.
9 & 10 Will. 3. c. 28	Exportation (Silver) Act 1697	An Act passed in the Ninth and Tenth Years of the Reign of King William the Third, intituled An Act for the exporting Watches, Sword-hilts, and other Manufactures of Silver.	The whole act.
9 & 10 Will. 3. c. 40	Exportation Act 1697	An Act passed in the Ninth and Tenth Years of the Reign of King William the Third, intituled An Act for the Explanation and better Execution of former Acts made against Transportation of Wool, Fullers' Earth, and Scouring Clay.	So much as relates to the buying, selling, loading or Removal of Wool within Fifteen Miles of the Sea, in the Counties of Kent and Sussex. I.e., sections 4, 5 and 6.
10 & 11 Will. 3. c. 10	Wool Act 1698	An Act passed in the Tenth and Eleventh Years of the Reign of King William the Third, intituled An Act to prevent the Exportation of Wool out of the Kingdoms of Ireland and England into Foreign Parts, and for the Encouragement of the Woollen Manufacture in the Kingdom of England.	So much as remains unrepealed.
10 & 11 W. 3. c. 24	Billingsgate, etc. Act 1698	An Act passed in the Tenth and Eleventh Years of the Reign of King William the Third, intituled An Act for making Billingsgate a free Market for Sale of Fish.	So much as enacts, that no Fish (except Stock Fish and live Eels) taken or caught by any Foreigners, Aliens to this Kingdom (except Protestant Strangers inhabiting within this Kingdom), shall be imported in any Foreign Ship, Vessel or Bottom, under Pain of Forfeiture of such Ship, Vessel or Bottom, and of all such Fish so imported. I.e., section 13.
10 & 11 W. 3. c. 25	Trade to Newfoundland Act 1698	An Act passed in the Tenth and Eleventh Years of the Reign of King William the Third, intituled An Act to encourage the Trade to Newfoundland.	So much as relates to the Fisher upon the Coast of Newfoundland.
11 & 12 W. 3. c. 10	Encouragement of Manufactures Act 1698	An Act passed in the Eleventh and Twelfth Years of the Reign of King William the Third, intituled An Act for the more effectual employing the Poor by encouraging the Manufactures of this Kingdom.	The whole act. (Note: This act was repealed in full by the Statute Law Revision Act 1867 (30 & 31 Vict. c. 59). The Notes to the Statute Law Revision Act 1867 (30 & 31 Vict. c. 59) state "Repealed by 6 Geo. 4. c. 105., but in consequence of the qualifying words applicable to the repeal of this Act, among others, this repeal does not seem total in effect.".)
1 Ann. stat. 1. c. 26	Carriage of Corn, etc. Act 1702	An Act passed in the First Year of the Reign of Queen Anne, intituled An Act for the Relief of the Masters of Hoys and other Vessels carrying Corn and other Inland Provisions within the Port of London.	The whole act.
3 & 4 Ann. c. 5	Taxation Act 1704	An Act passed in the Third and Fourth Years of the Reign of Her late Majesty Queen Anne, intituled An Act for granting to Her Majesty a further Subsidy on Wines and Merchandize imported.	So much as enacts, that all Rice and Molasses shall be under like Securities and Penalties required to be imported into this Kingdom, Dominion of Wales, and Town of Berwick, as is provided for the Goods therein enumerated. I.e., section 12.
3 & 4 Ann. c. 8	Exportations, etc. Act 1704	An Act passed in the Third and Fourth Years of the Reign of Her late Majesty Queen Anne, intituled An Act to permit the Exportation of Irish Linen Cloth to the Plantations, and to prohibit the Importation of Scotch Linen into Ireland.	The whole act.
4 & 5 Ann. c. 12	Payment of Certain Regiments Act 1705	An Act passed in the Fourth Year of the Reign of Queen Anne, intituled An Act for laying further Duties on Low Wines, and for preventing the Damage to Her Majesty's Revenue by Importation of Foreign cut Whalebone, and for making some Provisions as to the Stamp Duties, and the Duties on Births, Burials and Marriages, and the Salt Duties, and touching Million Lottery Tickets, and for enabling Her Majesty to dispose of the Effects of William Kidd, a notorious Pirate, to the Use of Greenwich Hospital, and for appropriating the Public Monies granted in this Session of Parliament.	So much as enacts, that Persons dealing in Whalebone, having Foreign cut Whalebone (other than in Fins regularly imported), shall forfeit Thirty Pounds; and that the Masters of Vessels knowingly importing any cut Whale Fins or Whalebone shall forfeit Fifty Pounds.
6 Ann. c. 3	Duties on East India Goods Act 1707	An Act passed in the Sixth Year of the Reign of Queen Anne, intituled An Act for better securing East India Goods.	The whole act.
6 Ann. c. 17	East India Company Act 1707	An Act for assuring to the English Company trading to the East Indies, on account of the united Stock, a longer Time in the Fund and Trade therein mentioned, and for raising thereby the Sum of One million two hundred thousand Pounds, for carrying on the War and other Her Majesty's Occasions.	So much as enacts, that upon any Importation of any Goods or Merchandizes by the English Company trading to the East Indies, it shall and maybe lawful for the Commissioners and Officers of the Customs for the Time being, to take Bond for all such of the Customs and Duties as shall be chargeable thereon. I.e., section 11.
6 Ann. c. 19	Taxation (No. 6) Act 1707	An Act passed in the Sixth Year of the Reign of Queen Anne, intituled An Act for continuing the Half Subsidies therein mentioned, with several Impositions and other Duties, to raise Money by way of Loan, for the Service of the War and other Her Majesty's necessary and important Occasions, and for charging of Prize Goods and Seizures, and for taking off the Drawbacks of Foreign Cordage, and to obviate the clandestine Importation of wrought Silks.	So much as imposes a Penalty of Two hundred Pounds upon Persons importing any wrought Silk, or Silks mixed with Gold or Silver or any other Materials, and as forfeits the said Silks, and imposes a Penalty of One hundred Pounds upon the Person in whose Custody the same shall be found, or who shall sell or dispose of the said Silks.
8 Ann. c. 7	Taxation (No. 3) Act 1709	An Act passed in the Eighth Year of the Reign of Queen Anne, intituled An Act for granting to Her Majesty new Duties of Excise, and upon several imported Commodities, and for establishing a yearly Fund thereby, and by other Ways and Means to raise Nine hundred thousand Pounds, by Sale of Annuities, and (in default thereof) by another Lottery, for the Service of the Year One thousand seven hundred and ten.	So much as relates to the Importation and Warehousing of Pepper, and to the illegal Importation and Reshipping of Raisins, and other uncustomable or prohibited Goods. I.e., sections 7 to 17.
8 Ann. c. 13	Taxation, etc. Act 1709	An Act passed in the Eighth Year of the Reign of Queen Anne, intituled An Act for continuing several Impositions and Duties upon Goods imported, to raise Money by way of Loan for the Service of the Year One thousand seven hundred and ten, and for taking off the Overcash Duty on Coals exported in British Bottoms, and for better preventing Frauds in Drawbacks upon Certificate Goods, and for ascertaining the Duties of Corans imported in Venetian Ships, and to give further Time to Foreign Merchants for Exportation of certain Foreign Goods imported, and to limit a Time for Prosecution upon certain Bonds given by Merchants, and for continuing certain Fees of the Officers of the Customs, and to prevent Embezzlements by such Officers, and for appropriating the Monies granted to Her Majesty, and for replacing Monies paid or to be paid for making good any Deficiencies on all Annuity Acts, and for Encouragement to raise Naval Stores in Her Majesty's Plantations, and to give further Time for registering Debentures, as is therein mentioned.	So much as relates to the clandestine landing of Goods shipped for Drawback, or for the Allowance of Payment of any Drawback for Tobacco, or as to Securities given for the due Exportation of wrought Silks, or Plantation Bonds, or as to Fees allowed to be taken by Officers of the Customs, or as to Officers embezzling Goods. I.e., sections 16, 24, 25, 26.
8 Ann. c. 19	Copyright Act 1709	An Act passed in the Eighth Year of the Reign of Queen Anne, intituled An Act for the Encouragement of Learning, by vesting the Copies of printed Books in the Authors or Purchasers of such Copies during the Times therein mentioned.	So much as relates to the Import of Books without the Consent of the Proprietor. I.e., part of section 1.
9 Ann. c. 6	Lotteries Act 1710	An Act passed in the Ninth Year of the Reign of Queen Anne, intituled An Act for reviving, continuing and appropriating certain Duties upon several Commodities to be exported, and certain Duties upon Coals to be waterborne and carried coastwise, and for granting further Duties upon Candles for Thirty two Years, to raise One million eight hundred thousand Pounds by way of Lottery, for the Service of the Year One thousand seven hundred and eleven, and for suppressing such unlawful Lotteries and such Insurance Offices as are therein mentioned.	So much as directs that Security shall be given to the Officers of the Customs in the respective Ports when Coals shall be shipped for Ireland, the Isle of Man, or any of Her Majesty's Plantations. I.e., sections 6, 39 to 42 and 49.
9 Ann. c. 11	Taxation (No. 2) Act 1710	An Act passed in the Ninth Year of the Reign of Queen Anne, intituled An Act for laying certain Duties upon Hides and Skins, tanned or dressed, and upon Vellum and Parchment, for the Term of thirty two Years, for prosecuting the War and other Her Majesty's most necessary Occasions.	So much as relates to the marking of Hides or Skins to denote the Payment of Duty, and as relates to the Shipping and Exportation of Hides, Skins or Manufactures of Leather to Foreign Parts, and the Penalties for reshipping the same, and also as relates to the Commissioners and Officers of Her Majesty's Customs intermeddling with Elections. Section 6.
9 Ann. c. 28	Coal Trade Act 1710	An Act passed in the Ninth Year of the Reign of Queen Anne, intituled An Act to dissolve the present and prevent the future Combination of Coal Owners, Lightermen, Masters of Ships and others, to advance the Price of Coals, in prejudice of the Navigation, Trade and Manufactures of this Kingdom, and for the further Encouragement of the Coal Trade.	So much as enacts, that any Ship Master, whose Ship is laden with Coals only, and has entered into Bond to deliver the said Coals in some Port of Great Britain, may, upon producing his Coast Cocquet, and making Oath of the true Quantity of Coals on board his Ship (such Quantity not being less than is expressed in the said Cocquet), before the proper Officer of the Customs in any Port of Great Britain, pay the Custom or Overseas Duty for such Coals, and shall on such Payment receive a Certificate signed and sealed by the Customer and Comptroller of such Port, for such Duty so paid, which Certificate, being given into the Custom House of such Port where the Coals were laid on board, shall discharge the Coast Bond. I.e., section 6.
10 Ann. c. 19	Taxation Act 1711	An Act passed in the Tenth Year of the Reign of Queen Anne, intituled An Act for laying several Duties upon all Soap and Paper made in Great Britain, or imported into the same; and upon chequered and striped Linens imported, and upon certain Silks, Callicoes, Linens and Stuffs, printed, painted or stained; and upon several Kinds of stamped Vellum, Parchment and Paper; and upon certain printed Papers, Pamphlets and Advertisements; for raising the Sum of Eight hundred thousand Pounds by way of Lottery towards Her Majesty's Supply; and for licensing an additional Number of Hackney Chairs; and for charging certain Stocks of Cards and Dice; and for better securing Her Majesty's Duties to arise in the Office for the Stamp Duties by Licences for Marriages, and otherwise; and for Relief of Persons who have not claimed their Lottery Tickets in due Time, or have lost Exchequer Bills or Lottery Tickets; and for borrowing Money upon Stock (Part of the Capital of the South Sea Company) for the Use of the Public.	So much as relates to the Import of chequered, striped, printed, painted, stained and dyed Linens, and making of false Entries, by the Officers of the Customs, to defraud Payment of the Duties for Use of the Public.
10 Ann. c. 29	Importation Act 1711	An Act passed in the Tenth Year of the Reign of Queen Anne, intituled An Act for better ascertaining and securing the Payments to be made to Her Majesty for Goods and Merchandizes to be imported from the East Indies and other Places within the Limits of the Charter granted to the East India Company.	The whole act.
12 Ann. st. 1. c. 16	Sail Cloth Manufacture Act 1712	An Act passed in the Twelfth Year of the Reign of Queen Anne, intituled An Act for the better Encouragement of making Sail Cloth in Great Britain.	So much as which said Act, by an Act passed in the Forty fifth Year of the Reign of King George the Third, is grants a Bounty upon the Exportation of British made Sail Cloth or Canvas fit for or made into Sails, and as imposes a Penalty upon the stamping of Foreign Sail Cloth. I.e., sections 2 and 3.
12 Ann. st. 2. c. 8	Tobacco Trade Act 1713	An Act passed in the Twelfth Year of the Reign of Queen Anne, intituled An Act for encouraging the Tobacco Trade.	So much as enacts, that the Commissioners of the Customs for the Time being shall in all Cases where the Goods are or shall be brought into Her Majesty's Storehouses, which shall have remained there for the Space of Twelve Months, the Subsidy and other Duties not paid or compounded for or otherwise secured, to be publickly sold by Auction, and after Sale the Produce to be applied first towards Payment of Freight, Primage and Charges of Warehouse Room and other Charges that shall accrue thereon, next the Customs and Duties, and the Overplus to be paid to the Proprietor or other Persons authorized to receive the same; and also as enacts, that all such Commissioners or other Officers of the Customs who appointed them, and who were or should be appointed or employed shall be deemed to remain and continue in their respective Offices and Employments, notwithstanding the Death or Removal of any of the Commissioners of the Customs who appointed them. I.e., section 1 and 13.
12 Ann. st. 2. c. 18	Stranded Ships Act 1713	An Act passed in the Twelfth Year of the Reign of Queen Anne, intituled An Act for the preserving all such Ships and Goods thereof which shall happen to be forced on Shore or stranded upon the Coasts of this Kingdom or any other of Her Majesty's Dominions.	So much as relates to the Revenue of Customs.
1 Geo. 1. st. 2. c. 12	Taxation, etc. Act 1725	An Act passed in the First Year of the Reign of King George the First, intituled An Act for enlarging the Fund of the Governor and Company of the Bank of England relating to Exchequer Bills, and for settling an additional Revenue of One hundred and twenty thousand Pounds per Annum upon His Majesty during His Life, for the Service of Civil Government; and for establishing a certain Fund of Fifty four thousand six hundred Pounds per Annum, to raise a Sum not exceeding Nine hundred and ten thousand Pounds for the Service of the Public, by Sale of Annuities, after the Rate of Six Pounds per Centum per Annum, redeemable by Parliament; and for satisfying an Arrear for Work and Materials at Blenheim, incurred whilst that Building was carried on at the Expense of Her late Majesty Queen Anne, of Blessed Memory, and for the Purposes therein mentioned.	So much as enacts, that all the Money arising by the Duties of the several Clauses before mentioned, which shall amount to Five hundred and seventy thousand Pounds, shall arise by such Duties, which are hereby declared to be granted and shall be raised by an Act of Parliament then passed in the Twenty fifth Year of the Reign of King Charles the Second (b) of Blessed Memory, intituled An Act for the Encouragement of the Greenland and Eastland Trade, were granted to His Majesty, His Heirs and Successors, for ever, commonly called the Plantation Duties (the necessary Charges of raising and paying the same excepted), shall also be lent and paid from time to time into the said Receipt of Exchequer, for the Purpose in this Act expressed, and be liable to such Redemption as is hereinafter prescribed in that Behalf. I.e., section 4.
1 Geo. 1. st. 2. c. 18	Fish Act 1714	An Act for the better preventing fresh Fish taken by Foreigners being imported into this Kingdom, and for the Preservation of the Fry of Fish, and for the giving Leave to import Lobsters and Turbots in Foreign Bot- toms, and for the better Preservation of Salmon within several Rivers in that Part of this Kingdom, called England	So much as enacts, that no Herring, Cod, Pilchards, Salmon, Ling, fresh or salted, dried or bloated, nor any Grill, Mackarel, Whiting, Haddock, Sprats, Coal Fish, Gull Fish, Conger, nor any Sort of Flat Fish or Fresh Fish whatsoever, shall be imported into or sold or exposed to Sale in that Part of this Realm called England, which shall be taken by or received from any Foreigners or out of any Stranger's Bottom, except Protestant Strangers inhabiting within this Kingdom; and shall only give or exchange any Goods or Victuals in exchange for any Fresh Fish taken as aforesaid; and also as imposing a Penalty of Twenty Pounds upon every Master or Commander of any Ship importing such Fish. I.e., sections 1 and 2.
3 Geo. 1. c. 4	Taxation Act 1716	An Act passed in the Third Year of the Reign of King George the First, intituled An Act for continuing the Duties on Malt, Mum, Cyder and Perry, for the Service of the Year One thousand seven hundred and seventeen; and to authorize Allowances to be made to certain Receivers; and to obviate a Doubt concerning Goods for the Heralds of Jersey, Guernsey, Sark and Alderney; and to ascertain the Duties upon Sheep Skins and Lamb Skins; and to prevent Frauds in the Duties upon Starch by making forth Duplicates of Exchequer Bills, Lottery Tickets and Orders, lost, burnt or destroyed and for enlarging the Time for adjusting Claims in several Lotteries; and for preventing Frauds in the Duties on Low Wines and Spirits carried coastwise.	So much as enacts, that the Inhabitants of Jersey, Guernsey, Sark and Alderney, shall and may, with and under certain Certificates and Oaths, import into any lawful Port of Great Britain, any Goods, Wares and Merchandizes of the Growth, Produce and Manufacture of the said Island or either of them, without paying any Customs, Subsidies or Duties for or in respect thereof. I.e., section 5.
5 Geo. 1. c. 11	Adulteration of Coffee Act 1718	An Act passed in the Fifth Year of the Reign of King George the First, intituled An Act against clandestine running of uncustomed Goods, and for the more effectual Preventing of Frauds relating to the Customs.	The whole act. (Note: This act repealed in whole by the Statute Law Revision Act 1958.)
6 Geo. 1. c. 11	Plate Duty Act 1719	An Act passed in the Sixth Year of the Reign of King George the First, intituled An Act for laying a Duty upon wrought Plate, and for applying the Money arising from the clear Produce thereof (by Sale of the forfeited Estates) towards answering His Majesty's Supply; and for taking off the Drawback upon Hops exported to Ireland; and for Payment of Annuities to be purchased after the Rate of Four Pounds per Centum per Annum, at the Receipt of His Majesty's Exchequer, out of the Monies arisen or to arise by certain Surplus granted in this Session of Parliament; and for preventing counterfeiting Receipts and Warrants of the Officers of the South Sea Company; and for explaining a late Act concerning Foreign Salt exported and relanded, and for giving further Time to Persons who have omitted to register Annuities and other Securities within the Time limited by Law for registering the same; and for Relief of Thomas Vernon Esquire, in the Year One thousand seven hundred and sixteen.	So much as relates to the Importation and Exportation of Plate, and to the Duties and Drawbacks thereon. I.e., sections 4, 5, 18 and 22.
6 Geo. 1. c. 12	Customs Act 1719	An Act passed in the Sixth Year of the Reign of King George the Third, intituled An Act for preventing Frauds and Abuses in the Allowance on damaged Wines, and for lengthening the Time for the Drawbacks on the Exportation of Wines.	as allows damaged or unmerchantable Wines to be staved or destroyed after landing, and the Duties to be repaid, and as allows a Compensation upon such Goods for Freight and other Charges.
6 Geo. 1. c. 21	Excise Act 1719	An Act passed in the Sixth Year of the Reign of King George the First, intituled An Act for preventing Frauds and Abuses in the Public Revenues of Excise, Customs, Stamp Duties, Post Office, and House Money.	So much as enacts, that if any Foreign Brandy or Spirits of any Kind whatsoever shall be imported or brought into Great Britain, in any Ship, Vessel or Boat of the Burthen of Forty Tons or under (except only for the Use of the Seamen then belonging to and on board such Ship, Vessel or Boat, not exceeding Two Gallons for each such Seaman), such Brandy or Spirits, together with the Ship, Vessel or Boat, shall be forfeited; and also so much of the said Act as empowers Commanders of Men of War, Frigates or armed Sloops, and Officers of the Customs, to seize Masters of Ships laden with Brandy, hovering within Two Leagues of the Shore, to come into Port; and also so much of the said Act as enacts, that if any Master or Person having charge of any Ship or Vessel shall suffer any Brandy or other uncustomed or prohibited Goods to be put out of the said Ship or Vessel into any Hoy, Lighter, Boat or Bottom, to be laid on Land, or shall suffer any Wool, Woolfels, Mortlings, Shortlings, Yarn made of Wool, Wool-Flocks, Fullers Earth, Fulling Clay, or Tobacco Pipe Clay to be water-borne to be shipped or taken on board from the Shore, to be carried to Parts beyond the Seas; besides the Penalties and Forfeitures to which they shall be liable, suffer Six Months Imprisonment without Bail or Mainprize; and also so much of the said Act as enacts, that if any Officer or Officers of the Customs shall be hindered, wounded or beaten, in the due Execution of their Office, by any Person armed with Clubs or any manner of Weapon, tumultuously assembled in the Day or Night, to the Number of Eight or more Persons, all and every Person so forcibly hindering, wounding or beating the said Officer or Officers, or such as shall act in their Aid or Assistance, being convicted thereof, by Verdict of Twelve Men, or by their own Confession, or by the Oaths of Two credible Witnesses before Two Justices of the Peace, shall be transported to some of His Majesty's Colonies and Plantations in America for Seven Years; and also so much of the said Act as authorizes Officers of the Customs to stop and put prohibited or uncustomed Goods into His Majesty's Warehouse, there to remain until the Claimer shall satisfy the Commissioners of His Majesty's Customs with respect to the same; and also so much of the said Act as forfeits Goods found on board Ships or Vessels outward bound, packed in Hogsheads, Casks or Bales. I.e., sections 19, 31 32, 34 and 39.
7 Geo. 1. St. 1. c. 21	Trade to East Indies, etc. Act 1720	An Act passed in the Seventh Year of the Reign of King George the First, intituled An Act for the further preventing His Majesty's Subjects from trading to the East Indies under Foreign Commissions; and for encouraging and further securing the lawful Trade thereto; and for further regulating the Pilots of Dover, Deal, and the Isle of Thanet.	So much as relates to the importation of East India or other Goods or Merchandizes into Ireland, Jersey, Guernsey, Alderney, Sark or Man, or into any Land, Island, Plantation, Colony, Territory or Place, to His Majesty or to the Crown of Great Britain belonging, or which shall hereafter belong to His Majesty, His Heirs or Successors, in Africa or America, of any Commodity of the Growth, Product or Manufacture of the East Indies, and other Places beyond the Cape of Good Hope, but such only as shall bona fide and without Fraud be laden and shipped in Great Britain, in Ships navigated according to the Laws then in being; and also so much of the said Act as allows Merchants and Traders exporting Foreign Goods for Drawback to make Entry of such Exportation, and have Certificate and Goods for that Purpose, according to the Importation from the Master's Report of his Ship. I.e., sections 9 and 10.
8 Geo. 1. c. 15	Silk Subsidies, Various Duties, Import of Furs, etc. Act 1721	An Act passed in the Eighth Year of the Reign of King George the First, intituled An Act for the Encouragement of the Silk Manufactures of this Kingdom, and for taking off several Duties on Merchandizes exported, and for reducing the Duties upon Beaver Skins, Pepper, Mace, Cloves and Nutmegs imported, and for Importation of all Furs of the Product of the British Plantations into this Kingdom only, and that the Two Corporations of Assurance, on any Suit brought on their Policies, shall be liable only to single Damages and Costs of Suit.	So much as relates to Allowances to be paid upon the Exportation of the Silk Manufactures of this Kingdom, or upon the Manufactures of Silk mixed with any other Materials, or as imposes any Penalty or Forfeiture upon the Shipment or relanding of such Goods; and also so much of the said recited Acts as enacts, that all Beaver Skins and other Furs of the Product of the British Plantations in America, Asia or Africa, shall be imported directly from thence into Great Britain, and laid on shore there and not elsewhere.
8 Geo. 1. c. 18	Customs, etc. Act 1721	An Act passed in the Eighth Year of the Reign of King George the First, intituled An Act to prevent the clandestine running of Goods, and the Danger of Infection thereby, and to prevent Ships breaking their Quarantine; and to subject Copper Ore of the Production of the British Plantations to such Regulations as other enumerated Commodities of the like Production are subject.	So much as relates to the Importation of Foreign Brandy and other Spirits in Vessels of less Burthen than Forty Tons; and as relates to the Forfeiture of Boats rowing with more than Four Oars above or below London Bridge, or within the Limits of the Ports of London, Sandwich or Ipswich, or the Members or Creeks to them or either of them respectively belonging; and also as relates to Per- sons passing with Foreign Goods landed without Entry, and being more than Five in Number, resist- ing Officers of the Customs or Excise in the seizing or securing any Sort of Run Goods or Commodities; and also as imposes a Penalty upon Persons receiving or buying any Run Goods, or being clandestinely concerned in the running of such Goods; and also as directs the Mode in which Seizures of Vessels and Boats are to be proceeded upon and dealt with; and also so much of the said Act as forfeits Goods removed from One Part of Great Britain into another, and landed before Delivery of the Cocquet to the proper Officer, and as forfeits Foreign Goods landed without the Presence of an Officer of the Customs; and also as relates to the Allowance for Freight on Wine staved, spilt or otherwise destroyed, or on Wine stranded; and as relates to the Importation of Copper Ore, the Produce of the British Plantations; and also as regards the Penalty imposed on Persons resisting Officers of the Customs and Excise in the due Execution of their Duty. I.e., sections 1, 2, 3, 6, 10, 16, 18, 19 22 and 25.
9 Geo. 1. c. 21	Customs Act 1722	An Act passed in the Ninth Year of the Reign of King George the First, intituled An Act for enabling His Majesty to put the Customs of Great Britain under the Management of One or more Commissions; and for the better securing and ascertaining the Duties on Tobacco; and to prevent Frauds in exporting Tobacco and other Goods and Merchandizes, or carrying the same coastwise.	So much as enacts, that if any Tobacco or other Foreign Goods or Merchandizes shall be taken on board any Ship or Vessel in Parts beyond the Seas, or out of any Ship or Vessel within the Limits of any Port of this Kingdom, or other the Places aforesaid, to be carried to any other Port or Place of the Kingdom or other the Places aforesaid, from whence such Goods shall be certified, that the said Goods and Double the Value thereof shall be forfeited, and the Master of the Coasting Ship shall forfeit the Value of the said Tobacco or other Goods. I.e., section 7.
11 Geo. 1. c. 30	Adulteration of Tea and Coffee Act 1724	An Act passed in the Eleventh Year of the Reign of King George the First, intituled An Act for the more effectual preventing Frauds and Abuses in the Public Revenue; for preventing Frauds in the Salt Duties and for giving Relief for Salt used in the curing of Salmon and Cod Fish, in the Year One thousand seven hundred and nineteen, exported from that Part of Great Britain called Scotland; for enabling the Insurance Companies to plead the General Issue in Actions brought against them; and for securing the Stamp Duties upon Policies of Insurance.	So much as enacts, that no Tobacco cut or Prohibited Goods for being harboured, kept or concealed, shall be imported from any Place whatsoever, other than the Place of its Growth; and also so much of the said Act as forfeits run and prohibited Goods for being harboured, kept or concealed, and imposes a Penalty of Treble the Value of the said Goods upon the Person or Persons who shall harbour, keep or conceal the same; and also as forfeits Goods offered for Sale as run Goods, and as imposes a Penalty upon the Seller or Buyer of such Goods; and as to the Proof required, upon Trial of an Information relating to His Majesty's Customs or Excise, of any Person being an Officer of the Customs or Excise. I.e., section 8 and 18 to 21.
12 Geo. 1. c. 28	Customs, etc., Revenues Act 1725	An Act passed in the Twelfth Year of the Reign of King George the First, intituled An Act for the Improvement of His Majesty's Revenue of Customs, Excise and Inland Duties.	So much as relates to the Sale of Tea and other forfeited Goods, which have been seized by Officers of the Customs and Excise, and to the Rewards to be paid to the said Officers on account thereof; and also, so much of the said Act as restrains Officers of the Customs and Excise from dealing or trading in Tea or Coffee or Brandy or other exciseable Liquors; and also so much of the said Act as imposes Onus probandi for seized Goods upon the Claimant, and not upon the seizing Officer; and also as enacts that all such Tobacco seized for being prohibited, or Nonpayment of Duties, as well not and for the Duties remaining unpaid as for the Officers resident fee for the same, shall be publicly sold to the highest bidder at the next Custom-house after Condemnation; and also so much of the said Act as enacts, that it shall be lawful for the Commissioners of His Majesty's Customs to apply for and take out, to and in their own Names or in the Name of any Officer first paid his Share of the same; and also as to Justices administering Oaths with respect to Seizures made by Officers of the Customs, to ascertain the Value; and also as enacts, that Bonds entered for Goods entered for Drawback, Bounty or Premium, or of prohibited Goods, and Goods shipped for Exportation without Warrant, or the Presence of an Officer; and also as to Goods brought into His Majesty's Warehouses for Security of the Duties; and also as to damaged Wines being distilled into § 22 to 24. Brandy or made into Vinegar; and to the Importation and Exportation of Goods to and from the Isle of Man; and also as to the filing of any Information for any Penalty by the Laws of the Customs, or § 28. making Compositions for the same. I.e., sections 1 to 20, 22 to 24 and 28.
1 Geo. 2. St. 2. c. 17	Customs, etc. Act 1727	An Act passed in the First Year of the Reign of King George the Second, intituled An Act for repealing the present Duties on Wines and Liquors, Wine Lees, and for prohibiting the Importation of Wine in Flasks, Bottles or small Casks, and for preventing Frauds in exporting Silk Manufactures, and for supplying the Want of regular Certificates of such Manufactures being landed in Foreign Parts where such Certificates cannot be had, and for giving further Time to Clerks and Apprentices to pay Duties omitted to be paid for their Indentures and Contracts.	As relates to the Importation of Wines in Flasks or Bottles, or Vessels containing less than Twenty-five Gallons and also as relates to the Prevention of Frauds in the Exportation of Silk Manufactures, and to the Discharge of Bonds given for the due Exportation of the same. Section 7 and 8.
2 Geo. 2. c. 28	Unlawful Games Act 1728	An Act passed in the Second Year of the Reign of King George the Second, intituled An Act to prevent the Importation of Fresh Fish caught by Foreigners, and to explain a Clause in an Act made in the Thirteenth and Fourteenth Years of the Reign of King Charles the Second, for preventing Frauds in the Customs, for the Encouragement of the Silk Manufactures of this Kingdom, for making Copper Ore of the British Plantations an enumerated Commodity, for explaining an Act made in the Ninth Year of His late Majesty's Reign, for settling the Trade to Africa, for the more effectual suppressing of Piracy, for enabling Persons prosecuted upon the Capias, in relation to the seeming of Goods to defend in forma pauperis, for more effectually deterring of his unlawful Games, for preventing Retailers of Brandy and other distilled Liquors, and for better regulating Licences for common Inns and Alehouses, to allow Persons arresting and imprisoned by virtue of a Writ of Capias or Information relating to the Customs, to defend the Action or Information in forma pauperis.	As allows Persons arrested and imprisoned by virtue of a Writ of Capias or In- formation relating to the Customs, to defend the Action or Information in forma pauperis. I.e., section 8.
2 Geo. 2. c. 35	Brick Making Act 1725	An Act passed in the Second Year of the Reign of King George the Second, intituled An Act for the better Preservation of His Majesty's Woods in America, and for the Encouragement of the Importation of Naval Stores from thence, and to encourage the Importation of Masts, Yards and Bowsprits from that Part of Great Britain called Scotland.	The whole act.
4 Geo. 2. c. 30	Coal Trade Act 1730	An Act passed in the Fourth Year of the Reign of King George the Second, intituled An Act for rendering more effectual an Act made in the Third Year of His Majesty's Reign, intituled . An Act for the better Regulation of the Coal Trade,' so far as the same relates to the preventing the inhancing the Price of Coals in the River Thames, by keeping of Turn in delivering Coals there.	As enacts, that the Master of every Ship or Vessel loaded with Coals, or other Person having the Care thereof, shall deliver or cause to be delivered to the proper Officer of the Customs at the Port of London, the Cocquets containing the Lading of such Ships or Vessels, within the Space of Four Days after the Arrival of such Ship or Vessel as high as Gravesend in the River Thames. I.e., section 2.
5 Geo. 2. c. 22	Hat Act 1731	An Act passed in the Fifth Year of the Reign of King George the Second, intituled An Act to prevent the Exportation of Hats out of any of His Majesty's Colonies or Plantations in America, and to restrain the Number of Apprentices taken by the Hatmakers in the said Colonies or Plantations, and for the better encouraging the making of Hats in Great Britain	As relates to the Transportation of Hats to Foreign Parts from any of the Plantations or Colonies in America. I.e., section 1.
5 Geo. 2. c. 24	Growth of Coffee Act 1731	An Act passed in the Fifth Year of the Reign of King George the Second, intituled An Act to prevent Frauds in the Trades of Callicoe Printers, and which said Act was in part made perpetual by an Act passed in the Twenty-ninth Year of the Reign of King George the Third.	As relates to the Oath of the Planters or his Agent previous to the Shipment of any Coffee on board any Vessel, and to the Oath of the Commander of the Vessel as to the Receipt thereof. I.e., section 3.
6 Geo. 2. c. 13	Trade of Sugar Colonies Act 1732	An Act passed in the Sixth Year of the Reign of King George the Second, intituled An Act for the better securing and encouraging the Trade of His Majesty's Sugar Colonies in America.	The whole act. (Note: This act was revived by the Customs Act 1826 (7 Geo. 4 c. 48).) (Note: The whole act was repealed by the Statute Law Revision Act 1867 (30 & 31 Vict. c. 59). The Notes to the Statute Law Revision Act 1867 (30 & 31 Vict. c. 59) state "Repealed by 6 Geo. 4. c. 105, but revived as to so much "as imposes any Duty to be paid to His Majesty" by 7 Geo. 4. c. 48. s. 59.; as to this virtually repealed by 8 & 9 Vict. c. 93.; see also 9 & 10 Vict. c. 94, and 16 & 17 Vict. c. 107. [Perpetuated by 4 Geo. 3. c. 15. s. 4.]".)
6 Geo. 2. c. 17	Spirit Duties Act 1732	An Act passed in the Sixth Year of the Reign of His Majesty King George the Second, intituled An Act for repealing an Act for laying a Duty on Compound Waters or Spirits, and for licensing the Retailers thereof, and for determining certain Duties on Brandy imported, and for granting other Duties in lieu thereof, and for enforcing the Laws for preventing the running of Brandies, as imposes a Penalty upon Officers of the Customs who shall neglect to seize and prosecute Vessels, Boats, Horses, Cattle or Carriages forfeited for the importing of Brandies.	As imposes a Penalty upon Officers of the Customs who shall neglect to seize and prosecute Vessels, Boats, Horses, Cattle or Carriages forfeited for the importing of Brandies. I.e., section 10.
7 Geo. 2. c. 19	Adulteration of Hops Act 1733	An Act passed in the Seventh Year of the Reign of King George the Second, intituled An Act for the more effectual preventing the clandestine Importation of Foreign Hops into Great Britain and Ireland; and to prevent the adulterating or sophisticating of Hops to alter the Colour or Scent thereof.	As relates to the Importation, maltreating or handling of Foreign Hops. Section 1.
9 Geo. 2. c. 33	Lobsters (Scotland) Act 1735	An Act passed in the Ninth Year of the Reign of King George the Second, intituled An Act to render the Law more effectual for preventing the Importation of Fresh Fish taken by Foreigners; and to explain so much of an Act made in the Thirteenth and Fourteenth Years of the Reign of King Charles the Second, as relates to Ships exporting Fish to the Mediterranean Sea, and for the better Preservation of the Fry of Lobsters on the Coast of Scotland.	As imposes the Penalty of One Hundred Pounds upon Persons importing Fish contrary to an Act passed in the First Year of the Reign of King George the First, and the Penalty of Fifty Pounds upon the Master or Commander of any Vessel in which such Fish shall be imported.
9 Geo. 2. c. 35	Offences Against Customs and Excise Laws Act 1735	An Act passed in the Ninth Year of the Reign of King George the Second, intituled An Act for indemnifying Persons who have been guilty of Offences against the Laws made for securing the Revenues of the Customs and Excise, and for enforcing those Laws for the future.	The whole act.
9 Geo. 2. c. 37	Manufacture of Sail Cloth Act 1735	An Act passed in the Ninth Year of the Reign of King George the Second, intituled An Act for further encouraging and regulating the Manufactures of British Sail Cloth, and the more effectual securing the Duties now payable on Foreign Sail Cloth imported into this Kingdom.	As requires certain Vessels to have a complete Suit of Sails of British Sail Cloth.
15 Geo. 2. c. 20	Gold and Silver Thread Act 1741	An Act passed in the Fifteenth Year of the Reign of King George the Second, intituled An Act to prevent the Counterfeit of Gold and Silver Lace; and for settling and adjusting the Proportions of fine Silver and Silk; and for the better making of Gold and Silver Thread.	As regards the Importation of Gold or Silver Thread, Lace, Fringe or any other Work made thereof, or any Thread, Lace, Fringe or other Work made of Copper, Brass or any other inferior Metal, or Gold or Silver Wire, or Plate. I.e., section 7.
15 Geo. 2. c. 31	Plantation Trade, etc. Act 1741	An Act passed in the Fifteenth Year of the Reign of King George the Second, intituled An Act for further regulating the Plantation Trade; and for Relief of Merchants importing Prize Goods from America, and for the preventing collusive Captures there; and for obliging Claimers of Vessels seized for Exportation of Wool, or any unlawful Importation, to give Security for Costs; and for allowing East India Goods to be taken out of Warehouses to be cleaned and refreshed.	As relates to the Condition of Plantation Bonds, and also as relates to the taking out of Warehouses East India Goods for the Purpose of being cleaned and refreshed.
18 Geo. 2. c. 24	Customs Act 1778	An Act passed in the Eighteenth Year of the Reign of King George the Second, intituled An Act for effectually preventing the Exportation of Foreign Linens under the Denomination of British and Irish Linens.	As relates to the Payment of Bounty upon the Exportation of British or Irish Linens. I.e., section 4.
18 Geo. 2. c. 26	House Duty Act 1778	An Act passed in the Eighteenth Year of the Reign of King George the Second, intituled An Act for repealing the present Inland Duty of Four Shillings per Pound Weight upon all Tea sold in Great Britain, and for granting His Majesty certain other Inland Duties in lieu thereof; and for better securing the Duty upon Tea and other Duties of Excise; and for pursuing Offenders out of one Country into another.	As relates to the Importation of Tea from Europe. I.e., sections 10, 11 and 12.
19 Geo. 2. c. 27	Sail Cloth Act 1745	An Act passed in the Nineteenth Year of the Reign of King George the Second, intituled An Act for the more effectually securing the Duties now payable on Foreign made Sail Cloth imported into this Kingdom, and for charging all Foreign made Sails with a Duty; and for explaining a Doubt concerning Ships being obliged at their first setting out to Sea to be furnished with One complete Set of Sails made of British Sail Cloth.	As relates to the Importation, Entry and Payment of Duty upon Foreign made Sails, and to the stamping of Sails or Sail Cloth, and as compels Ships built in Great Britain, or in His Majesty's Plantations in America, to be furnished with a Set of new Sails made of Sail Cloth manufactured in Great Britain, upon being first navigated. I.e., sections 1 to 12.
19 Geo. 2. c. 30	Sugar Trade Act 1745	An Act passed in the Nineteenth Year of the Reign of King George the Second, intituled An Act for the better encouragement of the Trade of His Majesty's Sugar Colonies in America.	As relates to the Lists of Men to be delivered to Officers of the Customs.
19 Geo. 2. c. 34	Offences against Customs or Excise Act 1745	An Act passed in the Nineteenth Year of the Reign of King George the Second, intituled An Act for the further Punishment of Persons going armed or disguised in defiance of the Laws of Customs or Excise, and for indemnifying Offenders against those Laws upon the Terms in this Act mentioned; and for Relief of Officers of the Customs in Informations upon Seizures.	The whole act. (Note: The whole act was repealed by the Statute Law Revision Act 1867 (30 & 31 Vict. c. 59). The Notes to the Statute Law Revision Act 1867 (30 & 31 Vict. c. 59) state "Repealed by 6 Geo. 4. c. 105., but the qualifying words of the repeal seem to restrain it from being total so far as this Act relates to the Excise. So far as not so repealed obsolete or unnecessary. [Perpetuated in part by 43 Geo. 3. c. 157. s. 1; which Act is repealed, with the Qualification mentioned above, by 6 Geo. 4. c. 105.])
22 Geo. 2. c. 36	Importation Act 1748	An Act passed in the Twenty second Year of the Reign of King George the Second, intituled An Act for the more effectual preventing the Importation and Wear of Foreign Embroidery and Brocade, and of Gold and Silver Thread, Lace or other Work made of Gold or Silver Wire manufactured in Foreign Parts.	The whole act.
22 Geo. 2. c. 37	Taxation Act (No. 3) 1748	An Act passed in the Twenty second Year of the Reign of King George the Second, intituled An Act for the better securing His Majesty's Duties arising upon Coals, Culm and Cinders exported beyond Sea.	The whole act.
23 Geo. 2. c. 13	Artificers, etc. Act 1749	An Act passed in the Twenty third Year of the Reign of King George the Second, intituled An Act for the effectual punishing of Persons convicted of seducing Artificers in the Manufactures of Great Britain or Ireland out of the Dominions of the Crown of Great Britain, and to prevent the Exportation of Utensils made use of in the Woollen and Silk Manufacture from Great Britain or Ireland into Foreign Parts; for the more easy and speedy Determination of Appeals allowed in certain Cases by an Act made in the last Sessions of Parliament, relating to Persons employed in the several Manufactures therein mentioned.	As relates to the Exportation of Tools or Utensils commonly used in or proper for the preparing, working, and finishing of the Woollen or Silk Manufactures of this Kingdom; I.e., sections 3 to 6.
23 Geo. 2. c. 21	Supply, etc. Act 1749	An Act passed in the Twenty third Year of the Reign of King George the Second, intituled An Act for granting to His Majesty the Sum of Nine hundred thousand Pounds out of the Sinking Fund, for the Service of the Year One thousand seven hundred and fifty, and for applying certain Surplus Monies remaining in the Exchequer as Part of the Supply of the said Year; and for the Application of certain Savings in the Hands of the Paymaster General; and for obviating a Doubt in an Act of the Fifth Year of King George the First, in respect of Payment of certain Annuities thereby granted for the Improvement of Fisheries and Manufactures in Scotland; and for the further appropriating the Supplies granted this Session of Parliament; and for giving further Time for the Payment of Duties omitted to be paid for the Indentures and Contracts of Clerks and Apprentices; and for transferring the Bounties now payable upon the Exportation of British Sail Cloth to the Customs; and for enforcing the Laws against the clandestine Importation of Soap, Candles and Starch into this Kingdom.	So far as regards the Payment of the Bounty on British Sail Cloth, and so far as restricts the Importation of Candles, Soap and Starch to Packages containing at least Two hundred and twenty four Pounds Weight of neat Candles, Soap or Starch, and that the same shall be openly stowed in the Hold of the Ship or Vessel importing the same; and also so much of the said Act as requires the Sufferance, Cocquet or Transire, granted for the Removal coastwise of Candles, Soap or Starch, to express the Quantity, Quality and Weight of the same. I.e., sections 26 to 30.
23 Geo. 2. c. 29	Importation, etc. Act 1749	An Act passed in the Twenty third Year of the Reign of King George the Second, intituled An Act to encourage the Importation of Pig or Bar Iron from His Majesty's Colonies in America; and to prevent the Erection of any Mill or other Engine for slitting or rolling of Iron, or any Plateing Forge to work with a Tilt Hammer, or any Furnace for making Steel, in any of the said Colonies.	As relates to the exporting or carrying Bar Iron coastwise. I.e., section 3.
24 Geo. 2. c. 51	Pot and Pearl Ashes Act 1750	An Act passed in the Twenty fourth Year of the Reign of King George the Second, intituled An Act for encouraging the making of Pot Ashes and Pearl Ashes in the British Plantations in America.	As imposes a Penalty upon Persons making an Entry of any Foreign Pot Ashes or Pearl Ashes under the Name or Description of Pot Ashes or Pearl Ashes of the Production of any of the British Colonies or Plantations in America, or of mixing the same. I.e., section 2.
26 Geo. 2. c. 13	Tobacco Trade, etc. Act 1753	An Act passed in the Twenty sixth Year of the Reign of King George the Second, intituled An Act for enforcing the Laws against Persons who shall steal or detain shipwrecked Goods, and for Relief of Persons suffering Losses thereby.	As relates to the Revenue of Customs. I.e., section 5.
26 Geo. 2. c. 21	Silk Manufactures Act 1753	An Act passed in the Twenty sixth Year of the Reign of King George the Second, intituled An Act for encouraging the Silk Manufacture of this Kingdom, and for securing the Duties payable upon the Importation of Velvets, wrought Silks, and other Materials, not manufactured in Great Britain.	The whole act.
28 Geo. 2. c. 21	Importation Act 1755	An Act passed in the Twenty eighth Year of the Reign of King George the Second, intituled An Act for making more effectual the Laws prohibiting the Importation of Spirituous Liquors in Casks or Vessels not containing Sixty Gallons, and of Tea above the Quantity of Six Pounds, found on board any Ship or Vessel not belonging to or employed by the East India Company.	The whole act.
29 Geo. 2. c. 15	Exportation Act 1756	An Act passed in the Twenty ninth Year of the Reign of King George the Second, intituled An Act for granting a Bounty upon certain Species of British and Irish Linens exported, and taking off the Duties on the Importation of Foreign raw Linen made of Flax; and which said Act has been continued by an Act passed in the Third Year of the Reign of His present Majesty (a), so long as Bounty is payable upon Irish Linen exported from Ireland.	The whole act.
29 Geo. 2. c. 16	Exportation (No. 2) Act 1756	An Act passed in the Twenty ninth Year of the Reign of King George the Second, intituled An Act to empower His Majesty to prohibit the Exportation of Saltpetre, and to enforce the Law for empowering His Majesty to prohibit the Exportation of Gunpowder or any Sort of Arms or Ammunition; and also to empower His Majesty to restrain the carrying coastwise Saltpetre, Gunpowder, or any Sort of Arms or Ammunition.	The whole act.
32 Geo. 2. c. 32	Importation (No. 3) Act 1758	An Act passed in the Thirty second Year of the Reign of King George the Second, intituled An Act for the more effectual preventing the fraudulent Importation of Cambricks and French Lawns.	The whole act.
33 Geo. 2. c. 28	Exportation (No. 2) Act 1759	An Act passed in the Thirty third Year of the Reign of King George the Second, intituled An Act for the encouraging the Exportation of Rum and other Spirits, of the Growth, Production and Manufacture of the British Sugar Plantations, from this Kingdom, and of British Spirits made from Molasses.	As relates to the Exportation of Rum, and the Penalties imposed for relanding the same.
2 Geo. 3. c. 24	Importation into Nova Scotia Act 1762	An Act passed in the Second Year of the Reign of King George the Third, intituled An Act for importing Salt from Europe into the Colony of Nova Scotia in America.	The whole act.
3 Geo. 3. c. 21	Silk Works Act 1763	An Act passed in the Third Year of the Reign of King George the Third, intituled An Act for explaining, amending and rendering more effectual an Act made in the Nineteenth Year of the Reign of King Henry the Seventh, intituled 'Silk Works'.	The whole act.
3 Geo. 3. c. 22	Customs Act 1763	An Act passed in the Third Year of the Reign of King George the Third, intituled An Act for the further Improvement of His Majesty's Revenue of Customs, and for the Encouragement of Officers making Seizures, and for Prevention of the clandestine running of Goods into any Part of His Majesty's Dominions.	The whole act.
4 Geo. 3. c. 19	Importation into Quebec Act 1763	An Act passed in the Fourth Year of the Reign of King George the Third, intituled An Act for importing Salt from Europe into the province of Quebec in America for a limited Time.	The whole act.
5 Geo. 3. c. 1	Importation Act 1765	An Act passed in the Fifth Year of the Reign of King George the Third, intituled An Act for the Importation of Salt Beef, Pork, Bacon and Butter from Ireland for a limited Time; which said Act was made perpetual by an Act passed in the Tenth Year of the Reign of King George the Third (a).	The whole act.
5 Geo. 3. c. 10	Importation Act 1765	An Act passed in the Fifth Year of the Reign of King George the Third, intituled An Act to permit the free Importation of Cattle from Ireland; which said Act was made perpetual by an Act passed in the Tenth Year of the Reign of King George the Third (b).	The whole act.
5 Geo. 3. c. 30	Customs, etc. (No. 2) Act 1765	An Act passed in the Fifth Year of the Reign of King George the Third, intituled An Act for more effectually supplying the Export Trade of this Kingdom to Africa and such coast granted Calicoes and other Goods, of the Product or Manufacture of the East Indies or other Places beyond the Cape of Good Hope, as are prohibited to be worn or used in Great Britain; for encouraging the Importation of Bugles into this Kingdom; for the better Supply of the Export Trade thereof, and for discontinuing the Bounty payable in Great Britain, and all Bounties and Allowances in Ireland, upon the Exportation of Corn, Grain, Malt, Meal and Flour from thence to the Isle of Man.	As relates to the Importation and warehousing of Bugles. I.e., sections 4 to 7.
5 Geo. 3. c. 37	Customs Act 1765	An Act passed in the Fifth Year of the Reign of King George the Third, intituled An Act for laying certain Duties upon Gum Senega and Gum Arabick imported into or exported from Great Britain, and for confining the Exportation of Gum Senega from Africa to Great Britain only.	The whole act.
5 Geo. 3. c. 39	Smuggling Act 1765	An Act passed in the Fifth Year of the Reign of King George the Third, intituled An Act for more effectually preventing the Mischief arising to the Revenue and Commerce of Great Britain and Ireland from the illicit and clandestine Trade to and from the Isle of Man.	The whole act.
5 Geo. 3. c. 43	Customs, etc., Revenues Act 1765	An Act passed in the Fifth Year of the Reign of King George the Third, intituled An Act for the better securing and further Improvement of the Revenues of Customs, Excise and Inland Duties, and for encouraging the Linen Manufacture of the Isle of Man, and for allowing the Importation of several Goods, the Produce and Manufacture of the said Island, under certain Restrictions and Regulations, as relates to unentered Goods found concealed in any Package or Merchandize sent to the King's Storehouses; and also as relates to damaged Wines; and also as relates to the Importation into Great Britain of Tobacco Stalks or Stems stript from the Leaf; and also as relates to the Proceedings against any Persons by Capias or otherwise, or against any Vessel, Cattle, or Carriage forfeited by the said Act or any other Act; or as relates to the Importation of Bastards and other Goods, the Growth and Manufacture of the Isle of Man, and the Bounties payable upon the Importation of British and Irish Linens; or as relates to the Importation of Spirits, or the Allowance of Drawbacks or Bounties on Goods exported to the Islands of Faro or Ferro, and to the Exportation of prohibited or other Goods to the said Islands; and also as relates to the Importation of Coffee in less Packages than One hundred and Twelve Pounds Weight, and to Vessels hovering within certain Distances of the Coast, and to the Shares to be paid to Officers for making Seizures, and the Mode of prosecuting such Seizures.	As relates to unentered Goods found concealed in any Package or Merchandize sent to the King's Storehouses; and also as relates to damaged Wines; and also as relates to the Importation into Great Britain of Tobacco Stalks or Stems stript from the Leaf; and also as relates to the Proceedings against any Persons by Capias or otherwise, or against any Vessel, Cattle, or Carriage forfeited by the said Act or any other Act; or as relates to the Importation of Bastards and other Goods, the Growth and Manufacture of the Isle of Man, and the Bounties payable upon the Importation of British and Irish Linens; or as relates to the Importation of Spirits, or the Allowance of Drawbacks or Bounties on Goods exported to the Islands of Faro or Ferro, and to the Exportation of prohibited or other Goods to the said Islands; and also as relates to the Importation of Coffee in less Packages than One hundred and Twelve Pounds Weight, and to Vessels hovering within certain Distances of the Coast, and to the Shares to be paid to Officers for making Seizures, and the Mode of prosecuting such Seizures. I.e., sections 1, 3, 4, 5, 11, 13, 21 to 24, 28 and 29.
5 Geo. 3. c. 45	Customs, etc. Act 1765	An Act passed in the Fifth Year of the Reign of King George the Third, intituled An Act for more effectually securing and encouraging the Trade of His Majesty's American Dominions; for repealing the Inland Duty on Coffee, imposed by an Act made in the Thirty second Year of His late Majesty King George the Second, and for granting an Inland Duty on all Coffee imported (except Coffee of the Growth of the British Dominions in America); for altering the Drawbacks upon Sugars exported; and for repealing Part of an Act made in the Twenty third Year of His said late Majesty, whereby Iron made in the said Dominions was prohibited to be exported from Great Britain, or carried coastwise; and for regulating the Fees of the Officers of the Customs in the said Dominions.	The whole act.
5 Geo. 3. c. 48	Spitalfields Act 1765	An Act passed in the Fifth Year of the Reign of King George the Third, intituled An Act for prohibiting the Importation of Foreign manufactured Silk Stockings, Silk Mitts, and Silk Gloves, into Great Britain and the British Dominions; and for rendering more effectual an Act passed in the Third Year of the Reign of His present Majesty, for explaining, amending, and rendering more effectual an Act made in the Nineteenth Year of the Reign of King Henry the Seventh, intituled 'Silk Works'.	The whole act.
6 Geo. 3. c. 19	Importation (No. 3) Act 1766	An Act passed in the Sixth Year of the Reign of King George the Third, intituled An Act for the more effectual Encouragement of Trade and Manufacture of Leather Gloves and Mitts in this Kingdom.	The whole act.
6 Geo. 3. c. 28	Importation, etc. Act 1766	An Act passed in the Sixth Year of the Reign of His Majesty King George the Third, intituled An Act to prohibit the Importation of Foreign wrought Silks and Velvets for a limited Time, and for preventing unlawful Combination of Workmen employed in the Silk Manufacture.	As relates to the Importation of Foreign wrought Silks and Velvets.
6 Geo. 3. c. 40	Supply, etc. Act 1766	An Act passed in the Sixth Year of the Reign of King George the Third, intituled An Act for explaining and amending such Part of an Act made in the Third Year of the Reign of His present Majesty, as relates to certain Duties on Wines imported; for the more easy collecting and effectually securing the Stamp Duties for Copies of Court Rolls; for Relief of Persons who have omitted to insert in Indentures, or other Writings, the full Sum agreed to be paid Clerks, Apprentices and other Servants; for amending such Parts of Two Acts made in the last Sessions of Parliament, as relate to certain East India Goods, and Bugles exported to Africa; for permitting a certain Quantity of Wheat, Barley, Oats, Meal and Flour to be exported from Great Britain to the Isle of Man, for the Use of the Inhabitants there; for allowing the Exportation of certain Quantities of Coals, free from the Payment of the Duty granted by an Act made in the last Sessions of Parliament, to the Islands of Jersey, Guernsey and Alderney; and for donating certain Duties with respect to the Importation of Oats and Oatmeal, under the Authority of an Act made in the present Sessions of Parliament.	As permits certain Quantities of Coals to be exported from Newcastle and Swansea to the Islands of Jersey, Guernsey and Alderney, without Payment of certain Duties. I.e., sections 9 to 11.
6 Geo. 3. c. 50	Customs Act 1766	An Act passed in the Sixth Year of the Reign of King George the Third, intituled An Act for allowing the Conveyance from the Ports of Southampton and Portsmouth, to the Port of Cowes in the Isle of Wight, of Goods not liable to Duty on Exportation, or prohibited to be exported, and of Sheep and Cattle, between the said Ports, without Coquets being taken or Bonds entered into for that Purpose; and for extending an Act made in the Twenty ninth Year of the Reign of King Charles the Second, for taking Affidavits in the county, to be made use of in the Court of King's Bench, Common Pleas, and Exchequer, to the Isle of Man; and for appointing Ports and Places for shipping and landing Goods in the said Island.	The whole act. (Note: The whole act was repealed by the Statute Law Revision Act 1867 (30 & 31 Vict. c. 59). The Notes to the Statute Law Revision Act 1867 (30 & 31 Vict. c. 59) state that this Act was repealed in "qualified terms; the qualification appears to except from repeal s. 2. That section is virtually repealed by 22 Vict. c. 16 ss. 3, 4.")
7 Geo. 3. c. 2	Importation and Exportation (No. 5) Act 1766	An Act passed in the Seventh Year of the Reign of King George the Third, to amend the last mentioned Act.	The whole act. (Note: The whole act was repealed by the Statute Law Revision Act 1867 (30 & 31 Vict. c. 59). The Notes to the Statute Law Revision Act 1867 (30 & 31 Vict. c. 59) states "See 6 Geo. 4. c. 105, which, among the Acts repealed by it, mentions an Act of the Seventh Year of King George the Third to amend 6 Geo. 3. c. 50, and in the margin gives the year and chapter of this Act; but this Act does not amend c. 50; the Act it amends is c. 52. of 6 Geo. 3, and no Act of this Year has been found that does amend c. 50.")
7 Geo. 3. c. 41	Commissioners of Customs Act 1766	An Act passed in the Seventh Year of the Reign of King George the Third, intituled An Act to enable His Majesty to put the Customs and other Duties in the British Dominions in America, and the Execution of the Laws relating to Trade there, under the Management of Commissioners to be appointed for that Purpose, and to be resident in the said Dominions.	The whole act.
7 Geo. 3. c. 43	Importation (No. 9) Act 1766	An Act passed in the Seventh Year of the Reign of King George the Third, intituled An Act to amend and enforce the Acts of the Eighteenth, Twenty first, and Thirty second Years of the Reign of His late Majesty King George the Second, for the more effectual preventing the fraudulent Importation and wearing of Cambrics and French Lawns.	The whole act.
7 Geo. 3. c. 45	Customs (No. 4) Act 1766	An Act passed in the Seventh Year of the Reign of King George the Third, intituled An Act for encouraging and regulating the Trade and Manufactures of the Isle of Man, and the more easy Supply of the Inhabitants there with a certain Quantity of Wheat, Barley, Oats, Meal and Flour, authorized by an Act made in this Session to be transported to the said Island.	The whole act.
7 Geo. 3. c. 46	Duties on Tea, etc. (American Plantations) Act 1766	An Act passed in the Seventh Year of the Reign of King George the Third, intituled An Act for granting certain Duties in the British Colonies and Plantations in America; for allowing a Drawback of Customs upon the Exportation from this Kingdom of Coffee and Cocoa Nuts of the Produce of the said Colonies or Plantations; for discontinuing the Drawbacks payable on China and Earthenware exported to America; and for more effectually preventing the clandestine running of Goods in the said Colonies and Plantations.	The whole act. (Note: This act was revived by the Customs Act 1826 (7 Geo. 4 c. 48).) (Note: The whole act was repealed by the Statute Law Revision Act 1867 (30 & 31 Vict. c. 59). The Notes to the Statute Law Revision Act 1867 (30 & 31 Vict. c. 59) state "Repealed by 6 Geo. 4. c. 105, but revived as to so much "as imposes any Duty to be paid to His Majesty" by 7 Geo. 4. c. 48. s. 59.; as to this virtually repealed by 8 & 9 Vict. c. 93.; and see 9 & 10 Vict. c. 94. and 16 & 17 Vict. c. 107.")
7 Geo. 3. c. 47	Duties (Logwood, etc.) Act 1766	An Act passed in the Seventh Year of the Reign of King George the Third, intituled An Act for discontinuing the Duties on Logwood exported; for taking off the Duties on Succus Liquoritiae imported, and for granting other Duties in lieu thereof; for explaining such Parts of Two Acts made in the Tenth and Twelfth Years of the Reign of Queen Anne, as relates to certain Duties on Silks painted or stained in Great Britain; for granting a Duty upon the Exportation of such Rice as shall have been imported Duty-free, in pursuance of an Act made in this Session of Parliament; and for the more effectual preventing the Wear of Foreign Lace and Needlework, which are prohibited to be imported into this Kingdom.	The whole act. (Note: The whole act was repealed by the Statute Law Revision Act 1867 (30 & 31 Vict. c. 59). The Notes to the Statute Law Revision Act 1867 (30 & 31 Vict. c. 59) state "Repealed by 6 Geo. 4. c. 105.; but, in consequence of the qualified terms of the repeal affecting this and other Acts, s. 6. does not seem included in the repeal. That section is, however, virtually repealed by 7 Geo. 4. c. 53 s. 5.")
8 Geo. 3. c. 22	Colonial Trade Act 1768	An Act passed in the Eighth Year of the Reign of King George the Third, intituled An Act for the more easy and effectual Recovery of the Penalties and Forfeitures inflicted by the Acts of Parliament relating to the Trade or Revenue of the British Colonies and Plantations in America.	The whole act.
8 Geo. 3. c. 25	Stamps Act 1768	An Act passed in the Eighth Year of the Reign of King George the Third, intituled An Act for reducing the Duties on foul Salt to be used for Manure; for altering the Stamp Duties on certain Policies of Insurances; for amending so much of an Act made in the Thirty third Year of the Reign of His late Majesty King George the Second, as relates to the Allowance of the Duties of Customs, and exempting from the Duties of Excise and Rum or Spirits, of the Growth, Production or Manufacture of the British Sugar Plantations in America, as shall be exported from this Kingdom; for the better securing the Excise Duties upon Foreign Liquors imported; and for repealing a Clause in an Act made in the last Session of Parliament, prohibiting the Sale of condemned Tea for Home Consumption; for amending such Parts of Two Acts, made in the Sixth and Seventh Years of the Reign of His present Majesty, as relates to the depositing in the Warehouses belonging to the Custom House in London Foreign wrought Silks and Velvets, and Cambrics and French Lawns, upon the Seizure thereof.	As relates to Foreign wrought Silks and Velvets, and other Works made thereof, and to all Cambrics and Lawns which may have been seized for any Cause of Forfeiture. I.e., section 10.
9 Geo. 3. c. 28	Exportation, etc. Act 1769	An Act made in the Ninth Year of the Reign of King George the Third, intituled An Act to permit the Inhabitants of Jersey and Guernsey to export directly from thence to Newfoundland, or the British Colonies in America, Goods necessary for the Fishery, under certain Restrictions, and to import from thence non-enumerated Goods (except Rum), and to land the same in the said Islands.	The whole act.
9 Geo. 3. c. 37	Poor Relief Act 1769	An Act passed in the Ninth Year of the Reign of King George the Third, intituled An Act for discontinuing, upon the Exportation of Iron imported in Foreign Ships, the Drawback of such Part of the Duties payable thereon as exceeds the Duties payable upon Iron imported in British Ships; to prohibit the Exportation of Pig and Bar Iron, and certain Naval Stores, unless the Preemption thereof be offered to the Commissioners of the Navy; to repeal so much of an Act made in the Sixth Year of His present Majesty's Reign, as discontinued the Drawback on Foreign rough Hemp exported; for providing a Compensation to the Clerks in the Offices of the Principal Secretaries of State, for the Advantages of such Clerks from the Expedition Money Clerks employed before the Commencement of an Act made in the Fourth Year of the Reign of His present Majesty, for preventing Frauds and Abuses in relation to the sending and receiving such Letters and Packets free from the Duty of Postage; and to explain and amend the said Acts.	As relates to the Exportation of Naval Stores. I.e., section 2.
9 Geo. 3. c. 39	Hides and Skins Act 1769	An Act passed in the Ninth Year of the Reign of King George the Third, intituled An Act to permit the free Importation of certain Raw Hides and Skins from Ireland and the British Plantations in America for a limited Time, and for taking off the Duties upon Seal Skins tanned or tawed in this Kingdom, and for granting another Duty in lieu thereof; for indemnifying all Persons with respect to advising or executing any of His Majesty's Orders of Council prohibiting the Importation of Raw Hides, Horns or Hoofs of infected Cattle; and to authorize the Prohibition of the Importation of such Hides, Horns and Hoofs for the future, as empowers His Majesty, by Proclamation or Order in Council, to prohibit generally, or from any particular Country or Countries, the Importation of any Hides or Skins, Horns or Hoofs, or any other Part of any Cattle or Beast, into the Kingdom of Great Britain or Ireland, to prevent any contagious Distemper from being brought into this Kingdom.	As empowers His Majesty, by Proclamation or Order in Council, to prohibit generally, or from any particular Country or Countries, the Importation of any Hides or Skins, Horns or Hoofs, or any other Part of any Cattle or Beast, into the Kingdom of Great Britain or Ireland, to prevent any contagious Distemper from being brought into this Kingdom. I.e., section 10.
9 Geo. 3. c. 41	Customs, etc. (No. 2) Act 1769	An Act passed in the Ninth Year of the Reign of King George the Third, intituled An Act for better securing the Duties of Customs upon certain Goods removed from the Out Ports and other Places to London; for regulating the Fees of the Officers of His Majesty's Customs in the province of Senegambia in Africa; for allowing to the Receivers General of the Duties on Offices and Employments in Scotland a proper Compensation for their Trouble and Expenses; for the better Preservation of Hollies, Thorns and Quicksets, in Forests, Chaces and private Grounds, and the Trees and Underwoods in Forests and Chaces; and for authorizing the Exportation of a limited Quantity of an inferior Sort of Barley called Bigg from the Port of Kirkwall in the Islands of Orkney.	As relates to the Removal of certain Goods from an Out Port in Great Britain to the Port of London, and also as relates to the Fees to be taken by the Officers of the Customs in Senegambia. I.e., sections 1 and 6.
10 Geo. 3. c. 37	Making of Indigo, etc. Act 1770	An Act passed in the Tenth Year of the Reign of King George the Third, intituled An Act for continuing so much of an Act in the Third Year of His present Majesty's Reign, intituled 'An Act to continue and amend Two Acts made in the Twenty first and Twenty eighth Years of His late Majesty's Reign, for encouraging the making of Indico in the British Plantations in America; and for extending the Provisions of an Act of the Thirtieth Year of His late Majesty's Reign, with respect to bringing Prize Goods into this Kingdom, to Spanish Prize Goods taken since the late Declaration of War with Spain.	As relates to the encouraging the making of Indico in the British Plantations in America; and for explaining so much of an Act made in the Fifth Year of His present Majesty's Reign, as relates to the Fees of the Officers of the Customs in America, and for extending the same to the Naval Officers there. I.e., section 2.
10 Geo. 3. c. 38	Exportation (No. 4) Act 1770	An Act passed in the Tenth Year of the Reign of King George the Third, intituled An Act for continuing the Bounties on British and Irish Linens exported; for further discontinuing the Duties on the Importation of Foreign raw Linen Yarn made of Flax; and for granting a Bounty on the Exportation of British chequed and striped Linens, and upon British and Irish Diapers, Huckabacks, Sheetings and other Linen of above a certain Breadth.	The whole act.
10 Geo. 3. c. 43	Customs (No. 3) Act 1770	An Act passed in the Tenth Year of the Reign of King George the Third, intituled An Act for repealing the Duties upon Bast or Straw, Chip, Cane and Horse Hair Hats and Bonnets, and upon certain Materials for making the same, imported into Great Britain; and for granting other Duties in lieu thereof; and for the more effectual preventing the fraudulent Importation of such Goods.	The whole act. (Note: The whole act was repealed by the Statute Law Revision Act 1871. The Notes to the Statute Law Revision Act 1871 state "Repealed in part by 6 Geo. 4. c. 105. Residue expired.")
10 Geo. 3. c. 45	Distemper Among Cattle Act 1770	An Act passed in the Tenth Year of the Reign of King George the Third, intituled An Act to prevent the further spreading of the contagious Disorders among the Horned Cattle in Great Britain.	The whole act.
11 Geo. 3. c. 41	Importation (No. 2) Act 1771	An Act passed in the Eleventh Year of the Reign of King George the Third, intituled An Act to explain an Act made in the Eighth Year of the Reign of His late Majesty King George the First, intituled 'An Act giving further Encouragement for the Importation of Naval Stores, and for other Purposes therein mentioned,' so far as relates to the Importation of unmanufactured Wood, the Growth and Production of America; and to explain so much of an Act made in the Twenty sixth Year of the Reign of His late Majesty King George the Second, intituled 'An Act for enlarging and regulating Trade into the Levant Seas,' as relates to the Importation of Raw Silk and Mohair Yarn landed at certain Places therein mentioned.	The whole act.
12 Geo. 3. c. 58	Herring Fisher Act 1772	An Act passed in the Twelfth Year of the Reign of King George the Third, intituled An Act for the Encouragement of the Herring Fishery on the Coast of the Isle of Man; and for obviating a Doubt which has arisen with respect to allowing the Bounties upon the British White Herring Fishery, in the Year One thousand seven hundred and seventy one, as permits the Inhabitants of the Isle of Man to export Herrings to the British Colonies or Plantations in America.	As permits the Inhabitants of the Isle of Man to export Herrings to the British Colonies or Plantations in America. I.e., section 4.
14 Geo. 3. c. 42	Light Silver Coin Act 1774	An Act passed in the Fourteenth Year of the Reign of King George the Third, intituled An Act to prohibit the Importation of Light Silver Coin of this Realm from Foreign Countries into Great Britain or Ireland, and to restrain the Tender thereof beyond a certain Sum; which said Act was made perpetual by an Act passed in the Thirty ninth Year of the Reign of King George the Third (b).	The whole act.
14 Geo. 3. c. 71	Exportation (No. 5) Act 1774	An Act passed in the Fourteenth Year of the Reign of King George the Third, intituled An Act to prevent the Exportation of Utensils made use of in the Cotton, Linen, Woollen and Silk Manufactures of this Kingdom.	The whole act.
15 Geo. 3. c. 31	Newfoundland Fisheries Act 1775	An Act passed in the Fifteenth Year of the Reign of King George the Third, intituled An Act for the Encouragement of the Fisheries carried on from Great Britain and Ireland, and the British Dominions in Europe; and for securing the Return of the Fishermen, Sailors and others, employed in the said Fisheries, to the Ports thereof, at the End of the Fishing Season.	As relates to the Revenue of Customs.
16 Geo. 3. c. 47	Whale Fishery, etc. Act 1776	An Act passed in the Sixteenth Year of the Reign of King George the Third, intituled An Act for the further Encouragement of the Whale Fishery carried on from Great Britain and Ireland, and the British Dominions in Europe; and for regulating the Fees to be taken by the Officers of the Customs in the Island of Newfoundland.	As relates to Fees taken by the Officers of Customs in the Island of Newfoundland. I.e., section 3.
16 Geo. 3. c. 48	Customs Act (No. 3) 1776	An Act passed in the Sixteenth Year of the Reign of King George the Third, intituled An Act for allowing further time for the Exportation or Payment of the Duties upon Bugles when warehoused upon Importation into this Kingdom; to empower the Commissioners of the Customs to order all Bonds relative to that Revenue, upon which no Prosecutions have been tried for the Space of Five Years (except those Bonds for Duties, and for the good Behaviour of Officers in the Execution of their Duty), to be cancelled; and for repealing the Duty upon Leather tanned or tawed in this Kingdom, and the charging the same with the like Duties as are payable upon Feathers for Beds.	The whole act.
17 Geo. 3. c. 41	Customs (No. 5) Act 1776	An Act passed in the Seventeenth Year of the Reign of King George the Third, intituled An Act to prevent the clandestine unshipping from and receiving Goods at Sea on board Vessels employed in the East India Company's Service; for ascertaining the Manner of discharging Bonds given for the due Exportation of certain Goods from Great Britain to Foreign Parts; and to oblige the Masters of British Ships sailing from any of His Majesty's Dominions in the Baltic, to deliver a Manifesto of their Cargoes to the British Consul residing there.	The whole act.
17 Geo. 3. c. 43	Customs (No. 6) Act 1776	An Act passed in the Seventeenth Year of the Reign of King George the Third, intituled An Act for repealing the Eleventh Rule in the Book of Rates, so far as the same relates to making any Allowance upon the Importation of damaged Currants and Raisins, and for making the Importers of such Goods an Abatement in the Duties in lieu thereof; and for explaining the said Rule with respect to such Allowance for Damage on other Goods; and to permit the Exportation of Tobacco Pipe Clay from this Kingdom to the British Sugar Colonies or Plantations in the West Indies, for a limited Time; which said Act was made perpetual by an Act passed in the Forty eighth Year of the Reign of King George the Third.	The whole act.
18 Geo. 3. c. 27	Customs (No. 3) Act 1778	An Act passed in the Eighteenth Year of the Reign of King George the Third, intituled An Act for granting His Majesty several additional Duties upon Wines and Vinegar imported into this Kingdom.	The whole act.
18 Geo. 3. c. 55	Exportation, etc. Act 1778	An Act passed in the Eighteenth Year of the Reign of King George the Third, intituled An Act to permit the Exportation of certain Goods directly from Ireland into any British Plantation in America, or any British Settlement on the Coast of Africa; and for further encouraging the Fisheries and Navigation of Ireland.	The whole act. (Note: The whole act was repealed by the Statute Law Revision Act 1861. The Notes to the Statute Law Revision Act 1861 state "Repealed by 6 Geo. 4. c. 105., but the terms are qualified, though it must, however, be regarded as total with respect to the Act here entered.")
18 Geo. 3. c. 58	Customs (No. 5) Act 1778	An Act passed in the Eighteenth Year of the Reign of King George the Third, intituled An Act to explain and amend so much of an Act made in the Fourth Year of His present Majesty, as relates to the clandestine Conveyance of Sugar and Paneles from the British Colonies and Plantations in America into Great Britain.	The whole act.
19 Geo. 3. c. 22	Continuance of Laws Act 1779	An Act passed in the Nineteenth Year of the Reign of King George the Third, intituled An Act to continue several Laws relating to the giving further Encouragement for the Importation of Naval Stores from the British Colonies in America; to the landing of Rum or Spirits of the British Sugar Plantations before Payment of the Duties of Excise; to the discontinuing the Duties payable upon the Importation of Tallow, Hogs Lard and Grease; to the regulating the Fees of Officers of the Customs and Naval Officers in America; to the allowing of certain Quantities of Wheat and other Articles to His Majesty's Sugar Colonies in America; and to the allowing a Drawback of the Duties on Rum shipped as Stores to be consumed on board Merchant Ships on their Voyage; and which Act was made perpetual by an Act passed in the Forty second Year of the Reign of King George the Third (b), so far as regards the Allowance on Drawbacks upon Rum shipped as Stores.	The whole act. (Note: The act was made perpetual so far as regards the Allowance on Drawbacks upon Rum shipped as Stores by Duties on Rum, etc. Act 1802 (42 Geo. 3. c. 20).)
19 Geo. 3. c. 48	Shipping and Navigation Act 1779	An Act passed in the Nineteenth Year of the Reign of King George the Third, intituled An Act to explain so much of an Act made in the Twelfth Year of the Reign of King Charles the Second, intituled 'An Act for the encouraging and increasing of Shipping and Navigation,' as relates to the Importation into this Kingdom, and other His Majesty's Dominions, of Goods and Commodities of the Growth or Production of Africa, Asia or America, which are manufactured in Foreign Parts; for preventing Masters of Ships removing their Vessels out of the Stream, except to the lawful Quays, in the Port of London, before the Goods are discharged or their Vessels are cleared by the proper Officers inwards or outwards; and for allowing the Officers of the Customs and Excise to make use of Lights on board Ships in the Haven, Dock or Bason at the Port of Kingston upon Hull.	The whole act. (Note: The whole act was repealed by the Statute Law Revision Act 1861. The Notes to the Statute Law Revision Act 1861 state "Repealed by 6 Geo. 4. c. 105., but the terms of the repeal are qualified; it must, however, be regarded as extending to the whole of the Act here entered, including s. 4. (Applied by 44 Geo. 3. c. 100. s. 2.) Repealed in part by 31 Geo. 3. c. 24. and 3 Geo. 4. c. 42. ss. 19, 20.)")
19 Geo. 3. c. 62	Customs (No. 4) Act 1779	An Act passed in the Nineteenth Year of the Reign of King George the Third, intituled An Act to permit the Removal of Lime, and other Articles necessary for the Improvement of Land, without Coquet or Bond.	The whole act.
19 Geo. 3. c. 69	Smuggling, etc. Act 1779	An Act passed in the Nineteenth Year of the Reign of King George the Third, intituled An Act for the more effectual preventing the pernicious Practices of Smuggling in this Kingdom, and for indemnifying Persons who have been guilty of Offences against the Laws of the Customs and Excise, upon the Terms therein mentioned.	The whole act. (Note: The whole act was repealed by the Statute Law Revision Act 1861. The notes to the Statute Law Revision Act 1861 state "Repealed by 6 Geo. 4. c. 105., but the terms of the repeal are peculiar; it is, however, to be regarded as total with respect to the Act here cited. (Amended by 26 Geo. 3. c. 77. s. 9.)".)
20 Geo. 3. c. 7	Customs Act 1780	An Act made in the Twentieth Year of the Reign of King George the Third, intituled An Act to amend an Act made in the Eighteenth Year of the Reign of His present Majesty, intituled 'An Act to explain and amend so much of an Act made in the Fourth Year of the Reign of His present Majesty, as relates to the preventing the clandestine Conveyance of Sugar and Paneles from the British Colonies and Plantations in America into Great Britain'.	The whole act.
20 Geo. 3. c. 10	Trade (No. 2) Act 1780	An Act passed in the Twentieth Year of the Reign of King George the Third, intituled An Act to allow the Trade between Ireland and the British Colonies and Plantations in America and the West Indies, and the British Settlements on the Coast of Africa, to be carried on in like Manner as it is now carried on between Great Britain and the said Colonies and Settlements.	The whole act.
20 Geo. 3. c. 49	Isle of Man Act 1780	An Act passed in the Twentieth Year of the Reign of King George the Third, intituled An Act for granting to His Majesty several additional Duties upon certain Goods imported into the Isle of Man, and for better regulating the Trade and securing the Revenues of the said Island.	The whole act.
21 Geo. 3. c. 16	Customs Act 1781	An Act passed in the Twenty first Year of the Reign of King George the Third, intituled An Act for repealing the Discounts and Abatements upon certain Foreign Goods, and for granting additional Duties upon Tobacco and Sugar imported into Great Britain.	The whole act.
21 Geo. 3. c. 28	Customs (No. 2) Act 1781	An Act passed in the Twenty first Year of the Reign of King George the Third, intituled An Act for allowing further Time for the Exportation of or Payment of the Duties upon Bugles when warehoused upon Importation into this Kingdom; and for obviating a Doubt with respect to charging the Duties on Gum imported from Scotland into the Isle of Man.	The whole act.
21 Geo. 3. c. 37	Exportation Act 1781	An Act passed in the Twenty first Year of the Reign of King George the Third, intituled An Act to explain and amend an Act made in the Fourteenth Year of the Reign of His present Majesty, intituled 'An Act to prevent the Exportation to Foreign Parts of Utensils made use of in the Cotton, Linen, Woollen and Silk Manufactures of this Kingdom'.	The whole act.
21 Geo. 3. c. 39	Smuggling Act 1781	An Act passed in the Twenty first Year of the Reign of King George the Third, intituled An Act for securing the Property of the Owners in such Ships or Vessels as are liable to Forfeiture for importing Spirits or other Goods, by the Misconduct of the Master and Seamen.	The whole act.
21 Geo. 3. c. 62	Importation (No. 4) Act 1781	An Act passed in the Twenty first Year of the Reign of King George the Third, intituled An Act to explain and amend an Act made in the Eighth and Ninth Years of the Reign of King William the Third, intituled 'An Act for lessening the Duty upon Tin and Pewter exported, and for granting an Equivalent for the same by a Duty upon Drugs,' so far as the same relates to the Importation of Drugs from the Russian Dominions; and also an Act made in the Third Year of the Reign of His present Majesty, intituled 'An Act for the further Improvement of His Majesty's Revenue of Customs, and for the Encouragement of Officers making Seizures, and for the Prevention of the clandestine running of Goods into any Part of His Majesty's Dominions,' to permit the Importation of Orchilla Weed and Cobalt during the present Hostilities, from any Place whatsoever, in British, Irish or Neutral Ships; and to permit Sugars, the Growth of Demerary and Essequibo, to be imported into Great Britain, upon Payment of the like Duties and under the like Restrictions as Sugars of the British Islands in the West Indies.	The whole act.
22 Geo. 3. c. 60	Seducing Certain Artificers to go Beyond Sea, etc. Act 1782	An Act passed in the Twenty second Year of the Reign of King George the Third, intituled An Act to prevent the seducing of Artificers or Workmen employed in printing Callicoes, Muslins and Linens, or in making or preparing Blocks, Plates or other Implements used in that Manufactory, to go to Parts beyond the Seas; and to prohibit the exporting to Foreign Parts of any such Blocks, Plates or other Implements.	The whole act.
22 Geo. 3. c. 78	Importation (No. 5) Act 1782	An Act passed in the Twenty second Year of the Reign of King George the Third, intituled An Act to permit Drugs the Produce of Hungary or Germany to be imported from the Austrian Netherlands, or any Part of Germany, upon Payment of the Single Duty; to allow the Importation of Hungary or Germany Wines, and organzined Thrown Silk, from the Austrian Netherlands, or any Part of Germany, into Great Britain, and of Timber and other Goods, from any Port of Europe, in Ships the Property of Subjects under the same Sovereign as the Country of which the Goods are the Growth, Production or Manufacture.	As relates to the Importation of organzined Thrown Silk, being the Growth, Production or Manufacture of Hungary, the Austrian Dominions, or any Part of Germany, into Great Britain. I.e., section 2.
23 Geo. 3. c. 11	Customs Act 1783	An Act passed in the Twenty third Year of the Reign of King George the Third, intituled An Act to amend an Act made in the Twenty fourth Year of the Reign of King George the Second, intituled 'An Act for the more effectual securing the Duties upon Tobacco;' to prohibit the Importation of Currants into Great Britain in small Packages; to repeal such Part of the Proviso of an Act of the Eighteenth Year of the Reign of His present Majesty, as permits Portugal and Spanish Wines, and other Wines (except French Wines), to be imported in small Casks for private Use; and for taking off the Inland Duty payable upon the Importation of Cocoa Nuts into this Kingdom, upon the Exportation thereof as Merchandize.	As relates to the Importation of Currants in Hogsheads or Casks, each of which shall contain at least Five hundred Pounds Weight Avoirdupois of net Currants.
23 Geo. 3. c. 76	Duties on Wines, etc. Act 1783	An Act passed in the Twenty third Year of the Reign of King George the Third, intituled An Act for the better preventing Frauds in the landing and removing of Wines in this Kingdom, and to prevent the relanding of Refined Sugar, entered for Exportation, to obtain the Drawback or Bounty.	The whole act. (Note: The whole act was repealed by the Statute Law Revision Act 1861. The Notes to the Statute Law Revision Act 1861 state "Repealed by 6 Geo. 4. c. 105., but the terms of the repeal are qualified; it is, however, in substance total with respect to the Act here entered. (Repealed in part by 26 Geo. 3. c. 59. s. 64.)")
23 Geo. 3. c. 79	Coffee and Cocoa-nuts Act 1783	An Act passed in the Twenty third Year of the Reign of His Majesty King George the Third, intituled An Act for the further encouraging the Growth of Coffee and Cocoa Nuts in His Majesty's Islands and Plantations in America.	As relates to the Revenue of the Customs.
24 Geo. 3. Sess. 2. c. 21	Hat Manufacture Act 1784	An Act passed in the Twenty fourth Year of the Reign of King George the Third, intituled An Act for the Preservation and Encouragement of the Hat Manufactory within this Realm, by preventing the Exportation of British Hare Skins, British Hare Wool and British Coney Wool, and all undressed or untanned Coney Skins; and from preventing any of the said Skins from being stained or dyed; and for the Importation of Goats' Hair Duty-free.	The whole act. (Note: The whole act was repealed by the Statute Law Revision Act 1871. The Notes to the Statute Law Revision Act 1871 state "Repealed by 6 Geo. 4. c. 105.; but it seems doubtful, owing to the qualified terms of the repeal, whether sect. 3. is included in it. If not it is obsolete.")
24 Geo. 3. Sess. 2. c. 47	Smuggling Act 1784	An Act passed in the Twenty fourth Year of the Reign of King George the Third, intituled An Act for the more effectual Prevention of Smuggling in this Kingdom.	The whole act.
24 Geo. 3. Sess. 2. c. 50	Exportation, etc. Act 1784	An Act passed in the Twenty fourth Year of the Reign of King George the Third, intituled An Act to revive and continue several Laws relating to the allowing the Exportation of certain Quantities of Wheat and other Articles to His Majesty's Sugar Colonies in America, and to the allowing a Drawback of the Duties on Rum shipped as Stores to be consumed on board Merchants' Ships on their Voyage; and to extend the Provisions of an Act of the Twenty third Year of His present Majesty, relative to the Removal of Wine in Casks, to Wine removed in Bottles or other Packages.	As relates to the Removal of Wine from one Port in Great Britain to another Port in the same.
25 Geo. 3. c. 54	Duties on Coals, etc. Act 1785	An Act passed in the Twenty fifth Year of the Reign of King George the Third, intituled An Act for the better securing the Duties upon Coals, Culm and Cinders.	The whole act.
25 Geo. 3. c. 55	Glove Duties Act 1785	An Act passed in the Twenty fifth Year of the Reign of King George the Third, intituled An Act for granting to His Majesty certain Duties on Licences to be taken out by Persons vending Gloves or Mittens, and also certain Duties on Gloves and Mittens sold by Retail, as relates to the Importation of Leather cut into the Form of Gloves or Mitts, called Shapes or Trunks, or which shall be cut into any other Manner or Form, to be made into Gloves or Mitts.	As relates to the Importation of Leather cut into the Form of Gloves or Mitts, called Shapes or Trunks, or which shall be cut into any other Manner or Form, to be made into Gloves or Mitts.
25 Geo. 3. c. 56	Cordage for Shipping Act 1785	An Act passed in the Twenty fifth Year of the Reign of King George the Third, intituled An Act for more effectually preventing Frauds and Abuses in the manufacturing of Cordage for Shipping, and to prevent the illicit Importation of Foreign made Cordage, as relates to Vessels arriving in Great Britain having on board Foreign made Cordage.	As relates to Vessels arriving in Great Britain having on board Foreign made Cordage. I.e., section 8.
25 Geo. 3. c. 67	Exportation Act (No. 2) 1785	An Act made in the Twenty fifth Year of the Reign of King George the Third, intituled An Act to prohibit the Exportation to Foreign Parts of Tools and Utensils made use of in the Iron and Steel Manufactures of this Kingdom; and to prevent the seducing of Artificers or Workmen employed in those Manufactures, to go into Parts beyond the Seas.	The whole act.
26 Geo. 3. c. 26	Newfoundland Fisheries Act 1786	An Act passed in the Twenty sixth Year of the Reign of King George the Third, intituled An Act to amend and render more effectual the several Laws now in force for encouraging the Fisheries carried on at Newfoundland and Parts adjacent, from Great Britain, Ireland and the British Dominions in Europe; and for granting Bounties for a limited Time on certain Terms and Conditions.	As relates to the Revenue of Customs.
26 Geo. 3. c. 36	Salt Duties, etc. Act 1786	An Act passed in the Twenty sixth Year of the Reign of King George the Third, intituled An Act to explain an Act made in the last Session of Parliament, with respect to the Allowance to be made for Waste on the Exportation of White Salt and Rock Salt to the Isle of Man; for limiting the Quantity of British Refined Sugar to be exported to the Isle of Man; and for repealing so much of an Act made in the Seventh Year of the Reign of His present Majesty, intituled ' An Act for encouraging and regulating the Trade and Manufacture of the Isle of Man, and for the more easy Supply of the Inhabitants there with a certain Quantity of Wheat, Barley, Oats, Meal and Flour, authorized by an Act made in this Session ' to be transported to the said Island,' as relates to permitting any Person to import into the Isle of Man Fish from any Place whatsoever, except from Great Britain, without Payment of any Custom or any other Duty whatsoever.	So far as regards the Importation of British Refined Sugar into the Isle of Man, and the Exportation of Sugar therefrom. I.e., sections 2 to 4.
26 Geo. 3. c. 40	Exports Act 1786	An Act passed in the Twenty sixth Year of the Reign of King George the Third, intituled An Act for regulating the Production of Manifests, and for more effectually preventing fraudulent Practices in obtaining Bounties and Drawbacks, and in the clandestine relanding of Goods.	The whole act. (Note: The whole act was repealed by the Finance Act 1918 (8 & 9 Geo. 5. c. 155).)
26 Geo. 3. c. 41	Fisheries Act 1786	An Act passed in the Twenty sixth Year of the Reign of King George the Third, intituled An Act for the further Support and Encouragement of the Fisheries carried on in the Greenland Seas and Davis's Streights.	The whole act. (Note: The whole act was repealed by the Statute Law Revision Act 1861. The notes to the Statute Law Revision Act 1861 state "Repealed by 6. Geo. 4. c. 105., but the terms of repeal are qualified; it is, however, to be regarded as total with respect to the Act here entered. The unrepealed part of the Act here entered had expired before the repeal by the last-mentioned Act (Repealed in part by 38 Geo. 3. c. 16. s. 1. and 59 Geo. 3. c. 103. s. 2.)")
26 Geo. 3. c. 59	Excise Act 1786	An Act passed in the Twenty sixth Year of the Reign of King George the Third, intituled An Act for repealing certain Duties now payable on Wines imported, and for granting new Duties in lieu thereof, to be collected under the Management of the Commissioners of Excise, as empowers Officers of the Customs to convey Wines to the Custom House Warehouse, for Security of the Duties, if, within Twenty Days after Entry is made of the Vessel in which the same shall be imported, due Entry be not made of the said Wine; and also, as empowers the Commissioners of the Customs to cause such Wine to be sold within Three Months after the same shall have been so conveyed to the said Warehouse.	As empowers Officers of the Customs to convey Wines to the Custom House Warehouse, for Security of the Duties, if, within Twenty Days after Entry is made of the Vessel in which the same shall be imported, due Entry be not made of the said Wine; and also, as empowers the Commissioners of the Customs to cause such Wine to be sold within Three Months after the same shall have been so conveyed to the said Warehouse. I.e., section 4.
26 Geo. 3. c. 89	Exportation (No. 4) Act 1786	An Act passed in the Twenty sixth Year of His Majesty King George Third, intituled An Act to explain, amend and extend to other Tools and Utensils, an Act made in the Twentyfifth Year of His present Majesty, intituled 'An Act to prohibit the Exportation to Foreign Parts of Tools and Utensils made use of in the Iron and Steel Manufactures of this Kingdom; and to prevent the seducing of Artificers or Workmen employed in these Manufactures, to go into Parts beyond the Sea;'.	The whole act.
26 Geo. 3. c. 104	Customs (No. 2) Act 1786	An Act passed in the Twenty sixth Year of the Reign of King George the Third, intituled An Act for allowing a Drawback of the Duties upon Coals used in smelting Copper and Lead Ores, and in Fire Engines for draining Water out of Copper and Lead Mines within the Isle of Anglesey.	The whole act.
27 Geo. 3. c. 13	Customs and Excise Act 1787	An Act passed in the Twenty seventh Year of the Reign of King George the Third, intituled An Act for repealing several Duties of Customs and Excise, and granting other Duties in lieu thereof, and for applying the said Duties together with the other Duties composing the Public Revenue; for permitting the Importation of certain Goods, Wares and Merchandize, the Produce or Manufacture of the European Dominions of the French King, into this Kingdom; and for applying certain unclaimed Monies remaining in the Exchequer, for the Payment of Annuities on Lives, to the Reduction of the National Debt.	As relates to the Importation or Exportation of Goods, Wares or Merchandize, or as relates to the Mode of collecting or securing Payment of Duties of Customs, or the Allowance of Drawback of such Duties, upon any Goods, Wares or Merchandize imported into or exported from this Kingdom.
27 Geo. 3. c. 32	Smuggling, etc. Act 1787	An Act passed in the Twenty seventh Year of the Reign of King George the Third, intituled An Act for making further Provisions in regard to such Vessels as are particularly described in an Act made in the Twenty fourth Year of the Reign of His present Majesty, for the more effectual Prevention of Smuggling in this Kingdom, and for extending the said Act to other Vessels and Boats not particularly described therein; for taking off the Duties on Flasks in which Wine or Oil is imported; for laying an additional Duty on Foreign Geneva imported; for taking off the Duty on Ebony, the Growth of Africa, imported into this Kingdom; and for amending several Laws relating to the Revenue of Customs.	The whole act.
28 Geo. 3. c. 34	Quarantine and Customs Act 1788	An Act passed in the Twenty eighth Year of the Reign of King George the Third, intituled An Act more effectually to secure the Performance of Quarantine, and for amending several Laws relating to the Revenue of Customs, as remains now in force and unrepealed.	The whole act. (Note: The whole act was repealed by the Statute Law Revision Act 1861. The Notes to the Statute Law Revision Act 1861 state "Repealed by 6 Geo.4. c. 105., but the terms of the repeal are qualified; it is, however, to be regarded as total with respect to the Act here entered. (Applied by 35 Geo. 3. c. 31. s. 2.) Repealed in part by 39 & 40 Geo. 3. c. 80. s. 8. and 4 Geo. 4. c. 14. s. 1.)")
28 Geo. 3. c. 38	Exportation (No. 2) Act 1788	An Act passed in the Twenty eighth Year of the Reign of King George the Third, intituled An Act to explain, amend and reduce into one Act of Parliament, several Laws now in being for preventing the Exportation of live Sheep, Lambs and Rams, Wool, Woolsels, Mortlings, Shortlings, Yarn and Worsted, Cruels, Coverlids, Waddings and other Manufactures, or pretended Manufactures, made of Wool slightly wrought up or otherwise put together, so as the same may be reduced to and made use of as Wool again, Mattresses or Beds stuffed with combed Wool or Wool fit for combing, Fullers' Earth, Fulling Clay, and Tobacco pipe Clay, from this Kingdom, and from the Isles of Jersey, Guernsey, Alderney, Sark and Man, into Foreign Parts; and for rendering more effectual an Act passed in the Twenty third Year of the Reign of King Henry the Eighth, intituled 'An Act for true winding of Wool;'.	The whole act. (Note: The whole act was repealed by the Statute Law Revision Act 1861. The Notes to the Statute Law Revision Act 1861 state "Repealed by 6 Geo. 4. c. 105., but the terms of the repeal are qualified; it is, however, to be regarded as total with respect to the Act here entered. (Repealed in part by (54 Geo. 3. c. 78. 57 Geo. 3. c. 88. s. 1. 1 & 2 Geo. 4. c. 81.)")
29 Geo. 3. c. 53	Coal Trade Act 1788	An Act passed in the Twenty ninth Year of the Reign of King George the Third, intituled An Act for further encouraging and regulating the Newfoundland, Greenland and Southern Whale Fisheries.	As relates to the Payment of Bounty for Ships proceeding to the Whale Fishery in the Greenland Seas or in Davis's Streights. I.e., sections 2 and 3.
29 Geo. 3. c. 68	Duties on Tobacco and Snuff Act 1789	An Act passed in the Twenty ninth Year of the Reign of King George the Third, intituled An Act for repealing the Duties on Tobacco and Snuff, and for granting new Duties in lieu thereof.	As relates to the Importation and Exportation of Tobacco and Snuff.
30 Geo. 3. c. 29	Importation and Exportation Act 1790	An Act passed in the Thirtieth Year of the Reign of King George the Third, intituled An Act for amending an Act passed in the Twenty seventh Year of the Reign of His present Majesty, intituled 'An Act for allowing the Importation and Exportation of certain Goods, Wares and Merchandize, in the Port of Kingston, Savannah la Mar, Montego Bay and Santa Lucca, in the Island of Jamaica, the Port of Saint Georges in the Island of Grenada, in the Port of Roseau in the Island of Dominica, and in the Port of Nassau in the Island of New Providence, One of the Bahama Islands, under certain Regulations and Restrictions; and for regulating the Duties on the Importation of Goods and Commodities, the Growth and Production of the Countries bordering on the province of Quebec,' as remains unrepealed.	The whole act.
30 Geo. 3. c. 43	Customs Seizures Act 1790	An Act passed in the Thirtieth Year of the Reign of King George the Third, intituled An Act to authorize the Commissioners of the Customs to defray Charges on Seizures out of His Majesty's Share of Seizures in general.	The whole act.
32 Geo. 3. c. 22	Fishery Act 1792	An Act passed in the Thirty second Year of the Reign of King George the Third, intituled An Act to continue and amend several Laws relating to the Encouragement of the Fisheries carried on in the Greenland Seas and Davis's Streights; and to amend the Laws now in force for the Encouragement of the Fisheries carried on in the Seas to the Southward of the Greenland Seas and Davis's Streights.	The whole act. (Note: The whole act was repealed by the Statute Law Revision Act 1861. The Notes to the Statute Law Revision Act 1861 state "Repealed by 6 Geo. 4. c. 105., but the terms of the repeal are qualified; it is, however, to be regarded as total with respect to the Act here entered.")
32 Geo. 3. c. 32	Customs Act 1792	An Act passed in the Thirty second Year of His Majesty King George the Third, intituled An Act to revive and continue so much of an Act made in the Sixth Year of the Reign of His present Majesty, as relates to the Conveyance of Sheep between Cowes in the Isle of Wight, and the Ports of Southampton and Portsmouth, and to extend the same to Horses and Lambs, and to amend the said Act.	The whole act.
32 Geo. 3. c. 43	Customs (No. 2) Act 1792	An Act passed in the Thirty second Year of the Reign of King George the Third, intituled An Act for regulating the Allowance of the Drawback and Payment of the Bounty on the Exportation of Sugar; and for permitting the Importation of Sugar and Coffee into the Bahama and Bermuda Islands in Foreign Bottoms.	The whole act.
32 Geo. 3. c. 50	Coast Trade Act 1792	An Act passed in the Thirty second Year of the Reign of King George the Third, intituled An Act for the Relief of the Coast Trade of Great Britain; for exempting certain Coast Documents from Stamp Duties; for abolishing the Bond usually called The Isle of Man Bond; and for permitting Corn and Grain brought coastwise to be transhipped into Lighters for the Purpose of being carried through the Forth Clyde.	The whole act.
33 Geo. 3. c. 2	Exportation Act 1793	An Act passed in the Thirty third Year of the Reign of King George the Third, intituled An Act to enable His Majesty to restrain the Exportation of Naval Stores, and more effectually to prevent the Exportation of Saltpetre, Arms and Ammunition, when prohibited by Proclamation or Order in Council.	The whole act.
33 Geo. 3. c. 48	Customs Act 1793	An Act passed in the Thirty third Year of the Reign of King George the Third, intituled An Act to allow the Drawback of the Duties of Customs and Excise upon Wines consumed by Admirals, Captains and other Commissioned Officers on board Ships of War in actual Service, and to allow such Ships to be supplied with Tobacco Duty-free.	The whole act.
33 Geo. 3. c. 56	Sugar Act 1793	An Act passed in the Thirty third Year of the Reign of King George the Third, intituled An Act to amend an Act made in the last Session of Parliament, intituled 'An Act for regulating the Allowance of the Drawback and Payment of the Bounty on the Exportation of Sugar;' and for permitting the Importation of Sugar and Coffee into the Bahama and Bermuda Islands in Foreign Ships; and for reducing the Bounty on Refined Sugars exported in any other than British Ships.	The whole act.
33 Geo. 3. c. 70	Customs (No. 2) Act 1793	An Act passed in the Thirty third Year of the Reign of King George the Third, intituled An Act for repealing the Duties and Drawbacks on Figs, and for granting and allowing other Duties and Drawbacks in lieu thereof; for charging a Duty on the Importation, and allowing a Drawback on the Exportation, of Virginal Wire of Copper; for empowering the Commissioners of the Customs to authorize their Officers to make Allowance for Damages received by Goods during the Voyage; and for authorizing the Commissioners of the Customs and Excise to sell Vessels liable to be broken up to private Persons, to be used as Privateers.	The whole act.
33 Geo. 3. c. 81	Customs (No. 3) Act 1793	An Act passed in the Thirty third Year of the Reign of King George the Third, intituled An Act to amend an Act passed in the Sixth Year of the Reign of His present Majesty, intituled 'An Act for allowing a Drawback of the Duties upon Coals used in smelting Copper and Lead Ores, and in Fire Engines for draining Water out of Copper and Lead Mines within the Isle of Anglesey;'.	The whole act.
34 Geo. 3. c. 20	Paper Duties Act 1794	An Act passed in the Thirty fourth Year of the Reign of King George the Third, intituled An Act for the repealing the Duties on Paper, Pasteboard, Millboard, Scaleboard, and Glazed Paper, and for granting other Duties in lieu thereof, as enacts, that Officers of the Customs at the Port or Place where any Foreign Paper shall be imported, shall cause the same to be marked, stamped or sealed, in such Manner as the Commissioners of His Majesty's Customs in England or Scotland shall think fit to direct.	As enacts, that Officers of the Customs at the Port or Place where any Foreign Paper shall be imported, shall cause the same to be marked, stamped or sealed, in such Manner as the Commissioners of His Majesty's Customs in England or Scotland shall think fit to direct. I.e., section 45.
34 Geo. 3. c. 34	Exportation Act 1794	An Act passed in the Thirty fourth Year of the Reign of King George the Third, intituled An Act for indemnifying all Persons who have been concerned in advising or carrying into Execution an Order of the Lords Commissioners of His Majesty's Treasury, respecting the Exportation of Pot Ashes or Pearl Ashes; for preventing Suits in consequence of the same; for authorizing His Majesty to prohibit the Exportation or carrying coastwise Pot Ashes or Pearl Ashes, and for making further Provision relative thereto.	The whole act.
34 Geo. 3. c. 42	Prize Act 1794	An Act passed in the Thirty fourth Year of the Reign of King George the Third, intituled An Act for granting Foreign Ships put under His Majesty's Protection the Privileges of Prize Ships, under certain Regulations and Restrictions; for allowing Aliens in Foreign Countries surrendered to His Majesty to exercise the Occupations of Merchants or Factors; and for repealing an Act passed in the Twelfth Year of the Reign of His late Majesty, intituled 'An Act for granting a Liberty to carry Sugars of the Growth, Production or Manufacture of any of His Majesty's Sugar Colonies in America, from the said Colonies directly to Foreign Parts, in Ships built in Great Britain, and navigated according to Law;' and also so much of an Act passed in the Fifteenth Year of His late Majesty as amends the said Act; as relates to aliens residing in any Place surrendered to His Majesty in the West Indies, acting as Merchants or Factors.	As relates to aliens residing in any Place surrendered to His Majesty in the West Indies, acting as Merchants or Factors. I.e., section 6.
34 Geo. 3. c. 50	Importation Act 1794	An Act passed in the Thirty fourth Year of the Reign of King George the Third, intituled An Act for repealing so much of an Act made in the Seventh Year of the Reign of His present Majesty, as directs that no Cambrics or Lawns shall be imported from Ireland, until the Importation of Cambrics and French Lawns into Ireland shall be prohibited by Law; to allow the Importation of Cambrics and French Lawns from the Austrian Netherlands for a limited Time; for making more effectual an Act made in the Twenty fourth Year of the Reign of His present Majesty, for the more effectual Prevention of Smuggling in this Kingdom, and for preventing the fraudulent relanding of Tobacco shipped for Exportation.	The whole act.
34 Geo. 3. c. 51	Customs Act 1794	An Act passed in the Thirty fourth Year of the Reign of King George the Third, intituled An Act for granting to His Majesty certain Duties of Customs on Slate, Stone and Marble.	The whole act.
34 Geo. 3. c. 68	Merchant Shipping Act 1794	An Act passed in the Thirty fourth Year of the Reign of King George the Third, intituled An Act for the further Encouragement of British Mariners, and for other Purposes therein mentioned.	The whole act.
35 Geo. 3. c. 31	Smuggling, etc. Act 1795	An Act passed in the Thirty fifth Year of the Reign of King George the Third, intituled An Act for extending the Provisions of an Act made in the Thirty fourth Year of the Reign of His present Majesty, to Cutters, Luggers, Shallops, Wherries, Smacks or Yawls, of any Built whatsoever; for amending an Act made in the Twenty eighth Year of the Reign of His present Majesty, more effectually to secure the Performance of Quarantine, and for amending several Laws relative to the Revenue of the Customs; for amending of an Act made in the Thirty third Year of the Reign of his present Majesty, intituled 'An Act for the Relief of the Captors of Prizes, with respect to the bringing and landing certain Prize Goods in this Kingdom;' and for authorizing the Commissioners of Excise at Edinburgh to grant Licences to Manufacturers and Dealers in Tobacco and Snuff, within the Limits of the Chief Office of Excise at Edinburgh.	As extends the Provisions of an Act passed in the Thirty fourth Year of the Reign of King George the Third, (Note: 34 Geo. 3. c. 50 s. 7) to every Cutter, Lugger, Shallop, Wherry, Smack or Yawl, belonging in the Whole or in Part to His Majesty's Subjects, of any Built whatsoever the same may be. I.e., section 1.
35 Geo. 3. c. 80	Drawback of Duties Act 1795	An Act passed in the Thirty fifth Year of the Reign of King George the Third, intituled An Act for allowing a Drawback of the Duties upon Coals used in carrying on the Pennygorod Works in the County of Pembroke.	The whole act.
35 Geo. 3. c. 92	Southern Whale Fisheries Act 1795	An Act passed in the Thirty fifth Year of the Reign of King George the Third, intituled An Act for further encouraging and regulating the Southern Whale Fisheries.	The whole act.
35 Geo. 3. c. 96	Relief of Revenue Prisoners Act 1795	An Act passed in the Thirty fifth Year of the Reign of King George the Third, intituled An Act for the Relief of Persons detained in Gaol for want of Bail, in certain Cases relating to the Public Revenue.	As relates to Persons detained in Gaol for assaulting or obstructing Officers of the Customs in the Execution of their Duty.
36 Geo. 3. c. 82	Landing of Merchandise Act 1796	An Act passed in the Thirty sixth Year of the Reign of King George the Third, intituled An Act more effectually to prevent the landing of Goods, Wares and Merchandize, without the Presence of the proper Officer; to authorize Officers of the Customs to convey Wines laying on the Quays to the King's Warehouse within a certain Time after the landing thereof; and to require the Owners of Ships, Vessels and Boats, licensed by the Admiralty, to give Security to re-deliver their Licences in case any such Ships, Vessels or Boats shall be lost, broken up or otherwise disposed of.	The whole act.
36 Geo. 3. c. 110	Customs (No. 3) Act 1796	An Act passed in the Thirty sixth Year of the Reign of King George the Third, intituled An Act for permitting the carrying coastwise of Lime, Limestone, Dung and other Articles of Manure, without taking out Sufferance, Transire or Let Pass.	The whole act.
37 Geo. 3. c. 73	Desertion of Seamen Act 1797	An Act passed in the Thirty seventh Year of the Reign of King George the Third, intituled An Act for preventing the Desertion of Seamen from British Merchants' Ships trading to His Majesty's Colonies and Plantations in the West Indies.	As requires Masters of Ships within Ten Days of their Arrival out at any Port in His Majesty's Colonies or Plantations, and also within Ten Days after their Arrival Home at any Port within Great Britain, to deliver, upon Oath, a true and exact List and Description of all and every the Crew on Board, and also a List of such of the Crew as shall have deserted or died during the Voyage, and of the Wages due to each Seaman. I.e., section 5.
38 Geo. 3. c. 33	Quarantine, etc. Act 1798	An Act passed in the Thirty eighth Year of the Reign of King George the Third, intituled An Act to amend Two Acts, made in the Twenty sixth Year of the Reign of King George the Second, and the Twenty eighth Year of the Reign of His present Majesty, respecting the Performance of Quarantine; for punishing Persons acting contrary to any Order in Council which may be made for laying any Embargo on Ships or Vessels, or for prohibiting or regulating the Exportation of any Goods, Wares or Merchandize; to prevent the fraudulent Importation of Goods into this Kingdom; for permitting the Removal of Coffee and Cocoa coastwise, for the greater Convenience of Exportation; to authorize the Commissioners of the Customs to return the Duties paid on Goods imported, which shall be lost or destroyed before the landing thereof; to prevent Vessels licensed by the Admiralty from being engaged in any Trade or Employment not permitted by their Licences; for permitting Wines put on board any of His Majesty's Ships to be removed from one Ship to another without being first landed and warehoused; and for extending the Provisions of an Act made in the Thirty third Year of the Reign of His present Majesty, to Wines delivered into the Charge of the Collector and Comptroller of His Majesty's Customs at the Port of Falmouth.	The whole act.
38 Geo. 3. c. 57	Southern Whale Fisheries Act 1798	An Act passed in the Thirty eighth Year of the Reign of King George the Third, intituled An Act for further encouraging the Southern Whale Fisheries.	The whole act.
38 Geo. 3. c. 67	Exportation (No. 2) Act 1798	An Act passed in the Thirty eighth Year of the Reign of King George the Third, intituled An Act to prevent the Exportation of Base Coin to His Majesty's Colonies in the West Indies and America.	The whole act.
38 Geo. 3. c. 86	Customs Act 1798	An Act passed in the Thirty eighth Year of the Reign of King George the Third, intituled An Act for abolishing certain Offices in the Customs, and for regulating certain other Offices therein; and for applying the Fees which have been received from several Offices towards the Augmentation of the Superannuation Fund.	The whole act.
39 Geo. 3. c. 59	Warehousing of Goods Act 1799	An Act passed in the Thirty ninth Year of the Reign of King George the Third, intituled An Act for permitting certain Goods imported from the East Indies to be warehoused, and for repealing the Duties now payable thereon, and granting other Duties in lieu thereof.	The whole act.
39 & 40 Geo. 3. c. 51	Customs Act 1800	An Act passed in the Thirty ninth and Fortieth Years of the Reign of King George the Third, intituled An Act to permit Blubber from the Greenland Fishery and Davis's Streights to be boiled into Oil after the Arrival of the Ships from the Fishery, and for charging the Duty thereon; for altering the Convoy Duty now payable on the Importation of Opium; for repealing the Duties on the Importation of Oil of Turpentine and Tar, and charging other Duties in lieu thereof; for exempting Burr Stones, and Stones used for the Purpose of paving, or the making or mending of Roads, from the Duty charged thereon when carried coastwise; for obliging Masters of Ships laden with Tobacco to remove the same from their Moorings when their Cargoes are discharged; and for extending Bonds given on licensing Ships, Vessels or Boats, to all Cases wherein Ships, Vessels or Boats may be liable to Forfeiture.	The whole act.
39 & 40 Geo. 3. c. 59	Customs (No. 2) Act 1800	An Act passed in the Thirty ninth and Fortieth Years of the Reign of King George the Third, intituled An Act to remove Doubts arising from the Construction of an Act made in the Thirty ninth Year of His present Majesty's Reign, intituled 'An Act for permitting certain Goods imported from the East Indies to be warehoused, and for repealing the Duties now payable thereon, and for granting other Duties in lieu thereof'.	The whole act.
39 & 40 Geo. 3. c. 83	Importation Act 1800	An Act passed in the Thirty ninth and Fortieth Years of the Reign of King George the Third, intituled An Act for permitting French Wines to be imported into this Kingdom from the Isles of Jersey, Guernsey or Alderney, in Bottles or Flasks.	The whole act.
41 Geo. 3. (G.B.) c. 2	Exportation (No. 3) Act 1800	An Act passed in the Forty first Year of the Reign of King George the Third, intituled An Act to authorize His Majesty from time to time to prohibit the Exportation of Provisions or Food.	The whole act.
41 Geo. 3. (U.K.) c. 21	Exportation Act 1801	An Act passed in the Forty first Year of the Reign of King George the Third, intituled An Act for permitting East India Goods prohibited to be worn or used in Great Britain, and warehoused, in pursuance of an Act made in the Thirty ninth Year of His present Majesty, to be removed by Land Carriage to certain Ports, for the Purpose of being exported to the British Colonies or Plantations in the West Indies.	The whole act.
41 Geo. 3. (U.K.) c. 73	Taxation Act 1801	An Act passed in the Forty first Year of the Reign of King George the Third, intituled An Act to permit the Exportation of Tea to Ireland, without the Payment of Duty, under certain Restrictions.	The whole act.
42 Geo. 3. c. 18	Southern Whale Fishery Act 1802	An Act passed in the Forty second Year of the Reign of King George the Third, intituled An Act for continuing the Provisions allowed to Ships employed in and for enlarging the Limits of the Southern Whale Fishery.	The whole act.
42 Geo. 3. c. 22	Greenland Whale Fisheries Act 1802	An Act passed in the Forty second Year of the Reign of King George the Third, intituled An Act for continuing, until the Twenty fifth of December One thousand eight hundred and four, the Bounties granted for the Encouragement of the Greenland Whale Fisheries, and for continuing and amending the Regulations respecting the same.	The whole act.
42 Geo. 3. c. 44	Importation Act 1802	An Act passed in the Forty second Year of the Reign of King George the Third, intituled An Act for permitting French Wines to be imported into Great Britain in Bottles or Flasks, under certain Restrictions.	The whole act.
42 Geo. 3. c. 82	Smuggling Act 1802	An Act passed in the Forty second Year of the Reign of King George the Third, intituled An Act to alter, amend and render more effectual an Act made in the Twenty fourth Year of the Reign of His present Majesty, for the more effectual Prevention of Smuggling in Great Britain.	The whole act.
42 Geo. 3. c. 95	Customs Act 1802	An Act passed in the Forty second Year of the Reign of King George the Third, intituled An Act for repealing the Duties granted by an Act made in this Session of Parliament, on Spermaceti Oil, Blubber, Train Oil, Fish Oil or Oil of Seals, and for granting other Duties in lieu thereof; for repealing the Duties granted by the said Act on Linen Yarn made of Flax, and on Goods, Wares or Merchandize imported by the East India Company, and exported from the Warehouse in which the same shall have been secured; for exempting Stone, the Produce of Guernsey, Jersey, Alderney, Sark or Man, from Duty; and for permitting Merchandize, the Produce of any of the Colonies ceded to the French and Batavian Republics, to be imported, for Three Years from the passing of this Act, upon the Payment of certain Duties.	The whole act.
42 Geo. 3. c. 97	Use of Clarke's Hydrometer Act 1802	An Act passed in the Forty second Year of the Reign of King George the Third, intituled An Act to authorize the Lord High Treasurer or Commissioners of the Treasury in Great Britain, and the Lord High Treasurer or Commissioners of the Treasury in Ireland, to order the Use of the Hydrometer now employed in the Management of the Revenues to be discontinued, and other Instruments to be used instead thereof.	The whole act.
43 Geo. 3. c. 68	Customs Act 1803	An Act passed in the Forty third Year of the Reign of King George the Third, intituled An Act to repeal the Duties of Customs payable in Great Britain, and to grant other Duties in lieu thereof.	The whole act.
43 Geo. 3. c. 128	Customs (No. 3) Act 1803	An Act passed in the Forty third Year of the Reign of King George the Third, intituled An Act for the further Regulation of the Collection of the Duties of Customs in Great Britain, in certain Cases.	The whole act.
43 Geo. 3. c. 157	Smuggling Act 1803	An Act passed in the Forty third Year of the Reign of King George the Third, intituled An Act to make perpetual so much of an Act made in the Nineteenth Year of the Reign of King George the Second, as relates to the further Punishment of Persons going armed or disguised, and to the Relief of Officers of the Customs in Informations upon Seizures.	The whole act. (Note: The whole act was repealed by the Statute Law Revision Act 1872. The Notes to the Statute Law Revision Act 1872 state "Repealed by 6 Geo. 4. c. 105., but the qualifying terms of the repeal seem to prevent it from being total so far as this Act relates to the Excise. So far as not so repealed, repeal by sequential or repeal by The Statute Law Revision Act, 1867, of Act perpetuated.")
45 Geo. 3. c. 9	Greenland Whale Fishery Act 1805	An Act passed in the Forty fifth Year of the Reign of King George the Third, intituled An Act for allowing Vessels employed in the Greenland Whale Fishery to complete their full Number of Men, at certain Ports, for the present Season.	The whole act.
45 Geo. 3. c. 10	Quarantine Act 1805	An Act passed in the Forty fifth Year of the Reign of King George the Third, intituled An Act for making further Provision for the effectual Performance of Quarantine.	The whole act.
45 Geo. 3. c. 68	Sailcloth Manufacture, etc. Act 1805	An Act passed in the Forty fifth Year of the Reign of King George the Third, intituled An Act for making perpetual and amending several Laws for encouraging the making of Sail Cloth in Great Britain, and securing the Duties on Foreign Sail Cloth imported; and for making perpetual several Laws for permitting the Importation of a certain Quantity of Corn and Grain to Guernsey, Jersey and Alderney, and for regulating the Fees of Officers of the Customs and of Naval Officers in the British Colonies in America; and of Officers of the Customs in Newfoundland.	The whole act. (Note: The whole act was repealed by the Statute Law Revision Act 1872. The Notes to the Statute Law Revision Act 1872 state "Repealed by 6 Geo. 4. c. 105., but the qualifying terms of the repeal seem to prevent it from being total so far as this Act relates to the Excise. So far as not so repealed, repeal by sequential or repeal by The Statute Law Revision Act, 1867, of Act perpetuated.")
45 Geo. 3. c. 96	Southern Whale Fishery Act 1805	An Act passed in the Forty fifth Year of the Reign of King George the Third, intituled An Act for continuing the Premiums allowed to Ships employed in the Southern Whale Fisheries.	The whole act.
45 Geo. 3. c. 99	Smuggling, etc. Act 1805	An Act passed in the Forty fifth Year of the Reign of King George the Third, intituled An Act for regulating and encouraging the Trade, for the Improvement of the Revenue, and Prevention of Smuggling to and from the Isle of Man.	The whole act.
45 Geo. 3. c. 121	Smuggling Act 1805	An Act passed in the Forty fifth Year of the Reign of King George the Third, intituled An Act for the more effectual Prevention of Smuggling.	The whole act.
45 Geo. 3. c. 122	Duties on Glass Act 1805	An Act passed in the Forty fifth Year of the Reign of King George the Third, intituled An Act for charging additional Duties on the Importation of Foreign Plate Glass in Great Britain.	The whole act.
45 Geo. 3. c. 128	Bringing of Coals, etc., to London, etc. Act 1805	An Act passed in the Forty fifth Year of the Reign of King George the Third, intituled An Act for allowing, under certain Restrictions, until the First Day of August One thousand eight hundred and six, the bringing a licensed Quantity of Coals, Culm or Cinders to London and Westminster by Inland Navigation; and which said Act was continued, by an Act passed in the First Year of the Reign of His present Majesty (a), until the Tenth Day of April One thousand eight hundred and twenty five.	The whole act.
46 Geo. 3. c. 9	Greenland Whale Fishery Act 1806	An Act passed in the Forty sixth Year of the Reign of King George the Third, intituled An Act for allowing, until the Signature of Preliminary Articles of Peace, Vessels employed in the Greenland Fishery to complete their full Number of Men at certain Ports.	The whole act.
46 Geo. 3. c. 74	Importation Act 1806	An Act passed in the Forty sixth Year of the Reign of King George the Third, intituled An Act for permitting Prussian Yarn to be imported in Foreign Ships, on Payment of the like Duties as if imported in British Ships.	The whole act.
46 Geo. 3. c. 81	Thread Lace Manufacture (England) Act 1806	An Act passed in the Forty sixth Year of the Reign of King George the Third, intituled An Act for the better encouraging the Manufacture of Thread Lace in Great Britain.	The whole act. (Note: The whole act was repealed by the Statute Law Revision Act 1872. The Notes to the Statute Law Revision Act 1872 state "Repealed by 6 Geo. 4. c. 105., but from the qualifying terms of the repeal it may be doubtful whether this Act is wholly repealed. The repeal is, however, regarded as total by the Treasury, see letter from the Treasury to Commissioners of Stamps, dated 24th October 1837. [Affected by 48 Geo. 3. c. 149. s. 46.]")
46 Geo. 3. c. 82	Fees, Port of London, etc. Act 1806	An Act passed in the Forty sixth Year of the Reign of King George the Third, intituled An Act for abolishing Fees received by certain Officers and other Persons employed in the Service of the Customs in the Port of London, and for regulating the Attendance of Officers and others so employed.	The whole act.
46 Geo. 3. c. 98	Quarantine (Great Britain) Act 1806	An Act passed in the Forty sixth Year of the Reign of King George the Third, intituled An Act for making additional and further Provision for the effectual Performance of Quarantine in Great Britain.	The whole act. (Note: The whole act was repealed by the Statute Law Revision Act 1872. The Notes to the Statute Law Revision Act 1872 state "Repealed by 6 Geo. 4. c. 105., but from the qualifying words attached to such repeal it may be doubtful whether its operation extends to the whole of this Act. So far as not so repealed it is repealed in general terms by 6 Geo. 4. c. 78.")
46 Geo. 3. c. 104	Bringing Coals to London, etc. Act 1806	An Act passed in the Forty sixth Year of the Reign of King George the Third, intituled An Act for continuing, until the First of August One thousand eight hundred and seven, an Act of the last Session of Parliament, for allowing, under certain Restrictions, the bringing a limited Quantity of Coals, Culm or Cinders to London and Westminster by Inland Navigation.	The whole act.
46 Geo. 3. c. 116	Exportation (No. 4) Act 1806	An Act passed in the Forty sixth Year of the Reign of King George the Third, intituled An Act to allow certain Articles to be exported from Gibraltar and Malta, direct to His Majesty's Colonies in North America, in return for British American Fish.	The whole act.
46 Geo. 3. c. 137	Bonding Warehouses Act 1806	An Act passed in the Forty sixth Year of the Reign of King George the Third, intituled An Act to extend the Provisions of an Act made in the Forty third Year of the Reign of His present Majesty, for permitting certain Articles to be warehoused in Great Britain, to other Articles not therein mentioned; and to alter the Condition of the Bond directed to be given by an Act of the Twenty fourth Year of His present Majesty, by the Masters and Owners of Vessels and Boats licensed by the Lords of the Admiralty.	The whole act.
46 Geo. 3. c. 150	Customs Act 1806	An Act passed in the Forty sixth Year of the Reign of King George the Third, intituled An Act for the better Regulation of the Office of Receiver General of the Duties of Customs in Great Britain.	The whole act.
47 Geo. 3 Sess. 1. c. 9	Exportation Act 1807	An Act passed in the Forty seventh Year of the Reign of King George the Third, intituled An Act for allowing the Exportation annually of a Quantity of Worsted Yarn to Canada.	The whole act.
47 Geo. 3 Sess. 1. c. 22	Bounties on Sugar Act 1807	An Act passed in the Forty seventh Year of the Reign of King George the Third, intituled An Act to allow, for Two Years from and after the passing of this Act, an additional Bounty on double refined Sugar, to such as shall be pounded, crashed or broken; and to allow for One Year certain Bounties on British Plantation Raw Sugar exported.	The whole act.
47 Geo. 3 Sess. 1. c. 25	Importation (No. 2) Act 1807	An Act passed in the Forty seventh Year of the Reign of King George the Third, intituled An Act to allow Turkey Tobacco to be imported into Great Britain in small Packages.	The whole act.
47 Geo. 3 Sess. 1. c. 26	Importation (No. 3) Act 1807	An Act passed in the Forty seventh Year of the Reign of King George the Third, intituled An Act for extending to German Yarn the Provisions of an Act made in the last Session of the last Parliament, for permitting Prussian Yarn to be imported in Foreign Ships on Payment of the like Duties as if imported in British Ships.	The whole act.
47 Geo. 3 Sess. 1. c. 48	Bonding of Coffee, etc. Act 1807	An Act passed in the Forty seventh Year of the Reign of King George the Third, intituled An Act to repeal so much of certain Acts as relates to the Regulations or Conditions under which Coffee, Cocoa Nuts, Sugar and Rice (not being the Produce of the East Indies), are allowed to be secured in Warehouses without Payment of Duty; and to authorize the Collector and Comptroller of the Customs in His Majesty's Colonies and Plantations in America and the West Indies to administer certain Oaths.	The whole act.
47 Geo. 3 Sess. 1. c. 49	Exportation Act (No. 3) 1807	An Act passed in the Forty seventh Year of the Reign of King George the Third, intituled An Act for permitting the Exportation of Fullers' Earth, Fulling Clay and Tobacco Pipe Clay, to any Place in Possession of His Majesty.	The whole act.
47 Geo. 3 Sess. 1. c. 51	Customs Act 1807	An Act passed in the Forty seventh Year of the Reign of King George the Third, intituled An Act to extend the Provisions of an Act made in the last Session of Parliament, for abolishing Fees received by certain Officers and other Persons employed in the Service of the Customs in the Port of London, and for regulating the Attendance of Officers and others so employed, to the Out Ports; and to appropriate the Fees of certain abolished and vacant Offices in the Customs to the Superannuation Fund.	The whole act.
47 Geo. 3 Sess. 2. c. 27	Importation (No. 4) Act 1807	An Act passed in the Forty seventh Year of the Reign of King George the Third, intituled An Act to authorize His Majesty to permit the Importation of Naval Stores from any Place in Ships belonging to States in Amity with His Majesty, and navigated in any Manner whatsoever.	The whole act.
47 Geo. 3 Sess. 2. c. 64	Bounty on British Calicoes Act 1807	An Act passed in the Forty seventh Year of the Reign of King George the Third, intituled An Act to allow the Bounty now payable on British Calicoes and Cottons exported to Gibraltar, to be paid on the same Articles when exported to Malta.	The whole act.
47 Geo. 3 Sess. 2. c. 66	Smuggling Act 1807	An Act passed in the Forty seventh Year of the Reign of King George the Third, intituled An Act to make more effectual Provision for the Prevention of Smuggling.	The whole act.
48 Geo. 3. c. 11	Importation Act 1808	An Act passed in the Forty eight Year of the Reign of King George the Third, intituled An Act for permitting the Importation of Goods from the Portuguese Territories on the Continent of South America, in Portuguese Ships.	The whole act.
48 Geo. 3. c. 12	Bounties on Sugar Act 1808	An Act passed in the Forty eighth Year of the Reign of King George the Third, intituled An Act to amend and continue, until the Twenty fifth Day of March One thousand eight hundred and nine, so much of an Act of the Forty seventh Year of His present Majesty, as allows certain Bounties on British Plantation Raw Sugar exported.	The whole act.
48 Geo. 3. c. 22	Exportation, etc. Act 1808	An Act passed in the Forty eighth Year of the Reign of His Majesty King George the Third, intituled An Act for making perpetual several Laws relating to permitting the Exportation of Tobacco Pipe Clay from Great Britain to the British Sugar Colonies in the West Indies, the Importation of Salt from Europe into Quebec in America, and the prohibiting of Foreign wrought Silks and Velvets.	The whole act.
48 Geo. 3. c. 84	Smuggling, etc. Act 1808	An Act passed in the Forty eighth Year of the Reign of King George the Third, intituled An Act for amending and rendering more effectual an Act passed in the last Session of Parliament, to make more effectual Provision for the Prevention of Smuggling; and for regulating the Periods for cancelling and delivering up certain Bonds relating to the Revenue of Customs.	The whole act.
48 Geo. 3. c. 55	Bringing of Coals, etc., to London, etc. Act 1808	An Act passed in the Forty eighth Year of the Reign of King George the Third, intituled An Act for continuing, until the First Day of August One thousand eight hundred and eleven, an Act of the Forty fifth of His present Majesty, for allowing, under certain Restrictions, the bringing a limited Quantity of Coals, Culm or Cinders to London and Westminster by Inland Navigation.	The whole act.
48 Geo. 3. c. 109	Trade with South America Act 1808	An Act passed in the Forty eighth Year of the Reign of King George the Third, intituled An Act to regulate the Trade between Great Britain and the Portuguese Territories on the Continent of South America.	The whole act.
48 Geo. 3. c. 124	Southern Whale Fisheries Act 1808	An Act passed in the Forty eighth Year of the Reign of King George the Third, intituled An Act for continuing the Premiums allowed to Ships employed in the Southern Whale Fishery.	The whole act.
48 Geo. 3. c. 17	Cape of Good Hope Trade Act 1809	An Act passed in the Forty ninth Year of the Reign of King George the Third, intituled An Act to authorize His Majesty, during the present War, to make Regulations respecting the Trade and Commerce to and from the Cape of Good Hope; and which said Act has been continued by an Act passed in the First Year of the Reign of His present Majesty (a), until the Fifth Day of July One thousand eight hundred and twenty five. (Note: 1 Geo. 4. c. 11)	The whole act.
49 Geo. 3. c. 46	Customs Act 1809	An Act passed in the Forty ninth Year of the Reign of King George the Third, intituled An Act to authorize the Principal Officers of the Customs in the British Colonies and Plantations in America and the West Indies, to examine Witnesses upon Oath.	The whole act. (Note: The whole act was repealed by the Statute Law Revision Act 1872 (No. 2). The Notes to the Statute Law Revision Act 1872 (No. 2) state "Repealed by 6 Geo. 4. c. 105., but see the qualifying terms of the repeal which make it doubtful whether the repeal is total as to this Act, as it relates in words to other duties besides Customs duties, though there are in fact no such other duties to which this Act is applicable.")
49 Geo. 3. c. 59	Trade with United States Act 1809	An Act passed in the Forty ninth Year of the Reign of King George the Third, intituled An Act to permit the Trade between Great Britain and the United States of America to be carried on in Ships or Vessels belonging to the Inhabitants of the said States.	The whole act.
49 Geo. 3. c. 61	Duty on Sugar, etc. Act 1809	An Act passed in the Forty ninth Year of the Reign of King George the Third, intituled An Act for making Sugar and Coffee of Martinique and Mariegalante liable to Duty on Importation, as Sugar and Coffee not of the British Plantations.	The whole act.
49 Geo. 3. c. 62	Smuggling Customs Regulations, etc. Act 1809	An Act passed in the Forty ninth Year of the Reign of King George the Third, intituled An Act to amend several Acts for the Prevention of Smuggling; for the better securing the Duties on Coals, Culm and Cinders; and for permitting the Exportation of Salt, Pepper and Wine from Guernsey or Jersey to Sark, in small Packages.	The whole act.
49 Geo. 3. c. 65	Customs (No. 2) Act 1809	An Act passed in the Forty ninth Year of the Reign of King George the Third, intituled An Act for giving Jurisdiction to Justices of the Peace to hear and determine Prosecutions for Penalties incurred by any Offence against the Laws relating to the Revenue of Customs; and also requiring all Goods customable and not Exciseable, seized by any Police or Peace Officer, to be brought to the Custom House Warehouse in London, after a certain Period.	The whole act.
49 Geo. 3. c. 98	Customs (No. 3) Act 1809	An Act passed in the Forty ninth Year of the Reign of King George the Third, intituled An Act for repealing the several Duties of Customs chargeable in Great Britain, and for granting other Duties in lieu thereof.	The whole act.
49 Geo. 3. c. 107	Penalties, etc., in British America Act 1809	An Act passed in the Forty ninth Year of the Reign of King George the Third, intituled An Act for the more effectual Recovery of Penalties and Forfeitures incurred in the British Colonies and Plantations in America.	The whole act.
50 Geo. 3. c. 35	Quarantine Act 1810	An Act passed in the Fiftieth Year of the Reign of King George the Third, intituled An Act for removing Doubts as to the Power of appointing Superintendents of Quarantine and their Assistants.	The whole act.
50 Geo. 3. c. 40	Bounty on Exportation Act 1810	An Act passed in the Fiftieth Year of the Reign of King George the Third, intituled An Act for discontinuing the Bounty on Exportation of Oil of Vitriol, and allowing a Drawback of a Proportion of the Duties paid on the Importation of Foreign Brimstone used in making Oil of Vitriol.	The whole act.
50 Geo. 3. c. 45	Isle of Man Customs Act 1810	An Act passed in the Fiftieth Year of the Reign of King George the Third, intituled An Act for consolidating the Duties of Customs for the Isle of Man, and for placing the same under the Management of the Commissioners of Customs in England.	The whole act.
50 Geo. 3. c. 55	Importation Act 1810	An Act passed in the Fiftieth Year of the Reign of King George the Third, intituled An Act to prohibit the Importation of Italian Silk Crapes and Tiffanies; and to increase the Shares payable to Officers in respect of Foreign-wrought Silks and Foreign manufactured Leather Gloves.	The whole act.
50 Geo. 3. c. 61	Duty on Sugar, etc. Act 1810	An Act passed in the Fiftieth Year of the Reign of King George the Third, intituled An Act for making Sugar and Coffee of Guadaloupe, Saint Eustatia, Saint Martin and Saba, liable to the same Duty on Importation as Sugar and Coffee not of the British Plantations.	The whole act.
50 Geo. 3. c. 62	Isle of Man Smuggling Act 1810	An Act passed in the Fiftieth Year of the Reign of King George the Third, intituled An Act for the more effectual Prevention of Smuggling in the Isle of Man.	The whole act.
50 Geo. 3. c. 110	Bringing of Coals, etc., to London, etc. Act 1810	An Act passed in the Fiftieth Year of the Reign of King George the Third, intituled An Act to allow, until the First Day of August One thousand eight hundred and eleven, the bringing of Coals, Culm and Cinders to London and Westminster by Inland Navigation; and which said Act has been continued by an Act passed in the First Year of the Reign of His present Majesty (a), until the First Day of August One thousand eight hundred and twenty five.	The whole act.
51 Geo. 3. c. 43	Duties on Certain Woods, etc. Act 1811	An Act passed in the Fifty first Year of the Reign of King George the Third, intituled An Act for altering the Time at which the additional Duties of Customs, imposed by an Act of the last Session of Parliament on certain Species of Wood, were to have taken place; and for granting Drawback upon Deals and Timber used in the Mines of Tin, Copper and Lead, in the Counties of Cornwall and Devon.	The whole act.
51 Geo. 3. c. 46	Quarantine Act 1811	An Act passed in the Fifty first Year of the Reign of King George the Third, intituled An Act to authorize the Officers of the Customs to act for the Superintendent of Quarantine and his Assistant.	The whole act. (Note: The whole act was repealed by the Statute Law Revision Act 1873. The Notes to the Statute Law Revision Act 1873 state "Repealed by 6 Geo. 4. c. 105.; but from the qualifying terms of the repeal it may be doubtful whether this Act is wholly repealed. So far as not so repealed it is repealed in general terms by 6 Geo. 4. c. 78. s. 1.")
51 Geo. 3. c. 48	Importation Act 1811	An Act passed in the Fifty first Year of the Reign of King George the Third, intituled An Act to permit Rum and other Spirits, the Produce of the British Colonies in the West Indies, to be imported into Lower Canada from Nova Scotia, and New Brunswick, and the Islands of Cape Breton, Prince Edward and Newfoundland.	The whole act.
51 Geo. 3. c. 50	Exportation Act 1811	An Act passed in the Fifty first Year of the Reign of King George the Third, intituled An Act to allow a greater Number of Sheep to be carried from England to the Isle of Man than are now permitted by Law.	The whole act.
51 Geo. 3. c. 52	Isle of Man Customs Act 1811	An Act passed in the Fifty first Year of the Reign of King George the Third, intituled An Act for explaining and amending an Act passed in the last Session of Parliament, for consolidating the Duties of Customs for the Isle of Man, and for placing the same under the Management of the Commissioners of Customs in England.	The whole act.
51 Geo. 3. c. 62	Importation (No. 3) Act 1811	An Act passed in the Fifty first Year of the Reign of King George the Third, intituled An Act to permit Rum and other Spirits, the Produce of the British Colonies in the West Indies, to be imported into Nova Scotia and New Brunswick, and the Islands of Cape Breton, Prince Edward and Newfoundland, from the Island of Bermuda.	The whole act.
51 Geo. 3. c. 71	Customs (No. 2) Act 1811	An Act passed in the Fifty first Year of the Reign of King George the Third, intituled An Act for the Abolition and Regulation of certain Offices in the Customs.	The whole act.
51 Geo. 3. c. 96	Customs (No. 3) Act 1811	An Act passed in the Fifty first Year of the Reign of King George the Third, intituled An Act to extend the Powers vested in the Commissioners of the Customs, of restoring Vessels and Goods seized, to Seizures made by virtue of any Acts relating to the Department of the Customs.	The whole act.
52 Geo. 3. c. 2	Customs Act 1812	An Act passed in the Fifty second Year of the Reign of King George the Third, intituled An Act to permit Sugar, the Produce of Martinique, and other conquered Islands in the West Indies, to be taken out of Warehouses on the Payment of the like Rate of Duty for Waste as British Plantation Sugar.	The whole act.
52 Geo. 3. c. 9	Duties on Coals, etc. Act 1812	An Act passed in the Fifty second Year of the Reign of King George the Third, intituled An Act to repeal an Act of the Twenty fifth Year of His present Majesty, for better securing the Duties on Coals, Culm and Cinders, and making other Provisions in lieu thereof; and for requiring Ships in the Coal Trade to be measured.	The whole act.
52 Geo. 3. c. 35	Jamaica and Saint Domingo Act 1812	An Act passed in the Fifty second Year of the Reign of King George the Third, intituled An Act to prohibit all Intercourse between the Island of Jamaica and certain Parts of the Island of St. Domingo.	The whole act.
52 Geo. 3. c. 55	Trade of Canada Act 1812	An Act passed in the Fifty second Year of the Reign of King George the Third, intituled An Act to prevent Foreign Goods of certain Descriptions being brought from the United States of America into Canada, and to allow a greater Quantity of Worsted Yarn to be exported from Great Britain to Canada.	The whole act.
52 Geo. 3. c. 100	Trade of West Indies Act 1812	An Act passed in the Fifty second Year of the Reign of King George the Third, intituled An Act to permit the Exportation of Goods, Wares and Merchandize from any of His Majesty's Islands in the West Indies to any other of the said Islands, and to and from any of the British Colonies on the Continent of America, and the said Islands and Colonies.	The whole act.
52 Geo. 3. c. 106	Duty of Spirits, Newfoundland Act 1812	An Act passed in the Fifty second Year of the Reign of King George the Third, intituled An Act for increasing the Duty on Rum and other Spirits imported into Newfoundland from the British Colonies and Plantations on the Continent of America, and charging a Duty on Spirits imported into Newfoundland from His Majesty's Colonies in the West Indies.	The whole act.
52 Geo. 3. c. 140	Exportation (No. 3) Act 1812	An Act passed in the Fifty second Year of the Reign of King George the Third, intituled An Act to permit the Exportation of certain Articles to the Isle of Man from Great Britain.	The whole act.
52 Geo. 3. c. 141	Customs Act (No. 5) 1812	An Act passed in the Fifty second Year of the Reign of King George the Third, intituled An Act to regulate the Manner of licensing Boats by the Commissioners of the Customs, and the delivering up of Licences in Cases of Loss or Capture of Vessels licensed; and for the enabling the Commissioners of the Customs to purchase certain Boats at a Valuation.	The whole act.
52 Geo. 3. c. 143	Land Tax Certificates Forgery Act 1812	An Act passed in the Fifty second Year of the Reign of King George the Third, intituled An Act for amending and reducing into One Act the Provisions contained in any Laws now in force, imposing the Penalty of Death for any Act done in Breach of or in Resistance to any Part of the Laws for collecting His Majesty's Revenue in Great Britain.	As relates to Offences committed in Breach of any Law relating to His Majesty's Customs, or for the preventing of Smuggling. I.e., section 1, 11 and 12.
52 Geo. 3. c. 159	Duties, etc., on Foreign Liquors, etc. Act 1812	An Act passed in the Fifty second Year of the Reign of King George the Third, intituled An Act for charging Foreign Liquors and Tobacco, Derelict, Jetsam, Flotsam, Lagan or Wreck, brought or coming into Great Britain, with the Duties payable on Importation of such Liquors and Tobacco.	The whole act.
53 Geo. 3. c. 3	Intercourse Between Jamaica and Saint Domingo Act 1812	An Act passed in the Fifty third Year of the Reign of King George the Third, intituled An Act to amend an Act of the last Session of Parliament, for prohibiting the Intercourse between the Island of Jamaica and Saint Domingo.	The whole act.
53 Geo. 3. c. 21	Prisoners for Certain Debts, etc. Act 1813	An Act passed in the Fifty third Year of the Reign of King George the Third, intituled An Act for authorizing the Commissioners of Customs and Excise to make an Allowance for the necessary Subsistence of poor Persons confined for Debts or Penalties sued for under their Orders.	The whole act. (Note: The whole act was repealed by the Statute Law Revision Act 1861. The Notes to the Statute Law Revision Act 1861 state "Repealed by 6 Geo. 4. c. 105. It is conceived that the repeal of the Act here entered is total; but see the terms of the repeal.")
53 Geo. 3. c. 44	Drawback on Wines Act 1813	An Act passed in the Fifty third Year of the Reign of King George the Third, intituled An Act for allowing a Drawback of the Duties upon Wines consumed by the Officers of the Royal Marines serving on board His Majesty's Ships.	The whole act.
53 Geo. 3. c. 47	Customs (No. 2) Act 1813	An Act passed in the Fifty third Year of the Reign of King George the Third, intituled An Act to empower the Officers of His Majesty's Customs to take Bonds from Persons under Twenty one Years of Age, serving as Mates on board of Merchant Vessels.	The whole act.
53 Geo. 3. c. 98	Exportation (No. 6) Act 1813	An Act passed in the Fifty third Year of the Reign of King George the Third, intituled An Act for the more correct Ascertainment of the Value of Free Goods exported.	The whole act.
53 Geo. 3. c. 105	Customs (No. 3) Act 1813	An Act passed in the Fifty third Year of the Reign of King George the Third, intituled An Act to explain and amend an Act of the present Session, for granting additional Duties of Customs on Goods, Wares or Merchandize imported into and exported from Great Britain; for allowing a Drawback on Carrot Tobacco exported; for altering the Duties on Pearls imported; for repealing the additional Duty on Bottled granted by the said Act; for allowing a Drawback of the additional Duties of Customs on Timber used in the Tin, Lead and Copper Mines of Devon and Cornwall; for ascertaining the Time when the Bounty of Goods exported may be claimed; for better preventing the clandestine Exportation of Goods; and for appropriating the Duties on Sugars, the Produce of Martinique and other Places, granted by an Act of this Session.	The whole act.
53 Geo. 3. c. 111	Southern Whale Fishery Act 1813	An Act passed in the Fifty third Year of the Reign of King George the Third, intituled An Act for the more easy Manning of Ships and Vessels employed in the Southern Whale Fishery.	The whole act.
53 Geo. 3. c. 125	Exportation (No. 7) Act 1813	An Act passed in the Fifty third Year of the Reign of King George the Third, intituled An Act to allow a Bounty upon the Exportation of Stuffs of Silks ornamented with Embroidery, Tambour, Needle Work, Lace or Fringe, and upon the Exportation of Ribbons made of Silk mixed with Inde or Cotton.	The whole act.
54 Geo. 3. c. 36	Customs, etc. Act 1813	An Act passed in the Fifty fourth Year of the Reign of King George the Third, intituled An Act to repeal the Duties of Customs payable on Goods, Wares and Merchandize imported into Great Britain from any Port or Place within the Limits of the Charter granted to the United Company of Merchants trading to the East Indies, and to grant other Duties in lieu thereof, and to establish further Regulations for the better Security of the Revenue on Goods so imported, and to alter the Periods of making up and representing certain Accounts of the said Company to Parliament, to continue in force until the Tenth Day of April One thousand eight hundred and nineteen.	As relates to the Revenue of Customs.
54 Geo. 3. c. 46	Writs of Assistance Act 1814	An Act passed in the Fifty fourth Year of the Reign of King George the Third, intituled An Act for altering the Period during which Writs of Assistance shall remain in force.	The whole act.
54 Geo. 3. c. 122	Customs (No. 8) Act 1814	An Act passed in the Fifty fourth Year of the Reign of King George the Third, intituled An Act to alter the Mode of declaring the Value of Goods imported or exported from Great Britain.	The whole act.
54 Geo. 3. c. 171	Customs, etc. Act 1814	An Act passed in the Fifty fourth Year of the Reign of King George the Third, intituled An Act to empower the Commissioners of His Majesty's Treasury to restore Seizures, or remit or mitigate Fines, Penalties or Forfeitures incurred concerning any Law relating to the Customs or Excise or Navigation and Trade of Great Britain.	The whole act. (Note: The whole act was repealed by the Statute Law Revision Act 1873. The Notes to the Statute Law Revision Act 1873 state "Repealed by 6 Geo. 4. c. 105.; but from the qualifying terms of the repeal it may be doubtful whether this Act is wholly repealed. So far as not so repealed it is repealed by 7 & 8 Geo. 4.")
54 Geo. 3. c. 185	Exportation (No. 5) Act 1814	An Act passed in the Fifty fourth Year of the Reign of King George the Third, intituled An Act to allow a Bounty on the Exportation from Great Britain of British made Cordage.	The whole act.
55 Geo. 3. c. 10	Duties upon East India Goods Act 1814	An Act passed in the Fifty fifth Year of the Reign of King George the Third, intituled An Act to make further Provision respecting the Duties payable upon East India Goods, and to allow Bond to be given for Payment of the Duties upon such Goods when imported by private Traders.	The whole act.
55 Geo. 3. c. 31	Exportation and Importation Act 1815	An Act passed in the Fifty fifth Year of the Reign of King George the Third, intituled An Act to amend certain Acts respecting the Exportation and Importation of Sugar, and further to regulate the Importation of Sugar, Coffee and other Articles, from certain Islands in the West Indies.	The whole act.
55 Geo. 3. c. 45	Southern Whale Fishery Act 1815	An Act passed in the Fifty fifth Year of the Reign of King George the Third, intituled An Act for continuing the Premiums allowed to Ships employed in the Southern Whale Fishery.	The whole act.
55 Geo. 3. c. 118	Customs and Excise Act 1815	An Act passed in the Fifty fifth Year of the Reign of King George the Third, intituled An Act to regulate the Clearance of Vessels and Delivery of Coast Bonds at Creeks and Harbours in Great Britain; for exempting certain Ships from being licensed by Commissioners of Customs; for authorizing Officers of the Customs to seize Spirits removing without Excise Permits; and for preventing Frauds in overlading Keels and other Carriages used in conveying Coals for Exportation or to be carried coastwise.	The whole act.
55 Geo. 3. c. 129	Drawbacks, etc., on Tobacco, etc. Act 1815	An Act passed in the Fifty fifth Year of the Reign of King George the Third, intituled An Act to increase the Drawbacks and Countervailing Duties on Tobacco; and to limit the Tonnage of Ships in which Wine may be exported when Duties are drawn back.	As relates to the Revenue of Customs.
55 Geo. 3. c. 174	Customs Act (No. 11) 1815	An Act passed in the Fifty fifth Year of the Reign of King George the Third, intituled An Act to extend the Exemption granted by Law on Coals and Culm for which the Coast Duties have been duly paid, on being again exported and carried to any other Place in this Kingdom, to Cinders or Coked Coals burnt from Pit Coals which has paid the Coast Duties.	The whole act.
56 Geo. 3. c. 9	Duties on Foreign Packets Act 1816	An Act passed in the Fifty sixth Year of the Reign of King George the Third, intituled An Act for charging certain Duties on Foreign Packets or Passage Vessels entering or departing any of the Ports of Great Britain.	The whole act.
56 Geo. 3. c. 35	Customs Act 1816	An Act passed in the Fifty sixth Year of the Reign of King George the Third, intituled An Act for the more effectual and speedy Collection of the Tonnage Duty upon Ships inwards; for empowering the Lords of the Treasury to regulate the Hours of Officers Attendance in the Port of London; and for permitting Ships to commence and complete their Loading of Coals before the Delivery of the Fitter's Certificate.	The whole act.
56 Geo. 3. c. 81	Oil of Vitriol Act 1816	An Act passed in the Fifty sixth Year of the Reign of King George the Third, intituled An Act to alter the Period during which Manufacturers of Oil of Vitriol are to deliver in their Accounts.	The whole act.
56 Geo. 3. c. 91	Trade of Demerara, etc. Act 1816	An Act passed in the Fifty sixth Year of the Reign of King George the Third, intituled An Act to regulate the Trade of the Colonies of Demerara, Berbice and Essequibo; to allow the Importation into and Exportation from such Colonies of certain Articles, by Dutch Proprietors of the European Dominions of His Majesty the King of the Netherlands; and to repeal an Act of the Fifty fourth Year of His present Majesty, for permitting a Trade between the United Provinces and certain Colonies in His Majesty's Possession.	The whole act.
56 Geo. 3. c. 93	Customs (No. 3) Act 1816	An Act passed in the Fifty sixth Year of the Reign of King George the Third, intituled An Act for enabling Officers of the Customs at Creeks, Harbours and Basins of Great Britain, to take Entries of Ships and Goods arriving from and bound to Ireland.	The whole act.
56 Geo. 3. c. 104	Excise (No. 2) Act 1816	An Act passed in the Fifty sixth Year of the Reign of King George the Third, intituled An Act for the making more effectual Provision for the Prevention of Smuggling, and rewarding Officers and Persons making Seizures and capturing Smuggling Vessels; for licensing Luggers employed in the North Sea Fishery, and obliging Exporters of Exciseable Goods on Drawback to give Notice of Shipment.	The whole act.
57 Geo. 3. c. 17	Exportation (No. 2) Act 1817	An Act passed in the Fifty seventh Year of the Reign of King George the Third, intituled An Act to repeal, during the Continuance of Peace, so much of an Act of the Ninth Year of His present Majesty, as prohibits the Exportation of Pig and Bar Iron and certain Naval Stores, unless the Pre-emption thereof be offered to the Commissioners of His Majesty's Navy.	The whole act. (Note: The whole act was repealed by the Statute Law Revision Act 1873. The Notes to the Statute Law Revision Act 1873 state "Spent : This Act is (among others) repealed by 6 Geo. 4. c. 105, but inasmuch as it contains nothing more than a partial repeal for which there is an express saving, the repeal seems a nullity.")
57 Geo. 3. c. 29	Trade, America, etc. Act 1817	An Act passed in the Fifty seventh Year of the Reign of King George the Third, intituled An Act to extend to Newfoundland the Provisions of an Act passed in the Fifty second Year of His present Majesty's Reign, for permitting the Exportation of Goods, Wares and Merchandize, from any of His Majesty's Islands in the West Indies to any other of the said Islands, and to and from any of the British Colonies on the Continent of America and the said Islands and Colonies.	The whole act.
57 Geo. 3. c. 33	Duties on Spirits, etc. Act 1817	An Act passed in the Fifty seventh Year of the Reign of King George the Third, intituled An Act to reduce the Allowance of Spirits, Tea and Tobacco, for the Use of the Seamen on board certain Ships or Vessels making short Voyages.	The whole act.
57 Geo. 3. c. 58	Exportation (No. 3) Act 1817	An Act passed in the Fifty seventh Year of the Reign of King George the Third, intituled An Act to allow British Goods to be exported direct from this Country to America, upon the same Terms as when exported to any Foreign Country.	The whole act.
57 Geo. 3. c. 87	Excise Drawback Act 1817	An Act passed in the Fifty seventh Year of the Reign of King George the Third, intituled An Act to amend Two Acts passed in the Forty fifth Year of His present Majesty, and in the last Session of Parliament, for the making more effectual Provisions for the Prevention of Smuggling.	The whole act.
57 Geo. 3. c. 95	Navigation Laws Act 1817	An Act passed in the Fifty seventh Year of the Reign of King George the Third, intituled An Act to exempt the Territories within the Limits of the East India Company's Charter from certain of the Navigation Laws.	The whole act.
57 Geo. 3. c. 116	Customs and Excise Act 1817	An Act passed in the Fifty seventh Year of the Reign of King George the Third, intituled An Act for limiting the Time now allowed by Law for Production of the Certificate of due Delivery of Goods removed from one Warehousing Port to another, for the Purpose of Exportation; for altering the Hours for shipping Goods in the Port of London; and to empower Officers of the Customs and Excise to permit the Removal of Goods from one Bonding Warehouse to another in the same Port.	The whole act.
58 Geo. 3. c. 15	Greenland Fisheries Act 1818	An Act passed in the Fifty eighth Year of the Reign of King George the Third, intituled An Act to amend an Act made in the Twenty sixth Year of His present Majesty, for the Encouragement of the Fisheries carried on in the Greenland Seas and Davis's Straits, so far as relates to the Oaths thereby required to be taken.	The whole act. (Note: The whole act was repealed by the Statute Law Revision Act 1873. The Notes to the Statute Law Revision Act 1873 state "Repealed by 6 Geo. 4. c. 105. but the terms of the repeal are qualified. So far as not so repealed repeal consequential on repeal by The Statute Law Revision Act, 1861, of 56 Geo. 3. c. 54.")
58 Geo. 3. c. 34	Exportation Act 1818	An Act passed in the Fifty eighth Year of the Reign of King George the Third, intituled An Act to repeal the several Bounties on the Exportation of Refined Sugar from any Part of the United Kingdom, and to allow other Bounties in lieu thereof, until the Fifth July One thousand eight hundred and twenty; and for reducing the Size of Packages in which Refined Sugar may be exported; and which said Act is continued by an Act passed in the First Year of the Reign of His present Majesty (a), until the First July One thousand eight hundred and twenty four.	The whole act.
58 Geo. 3. c. 76	Smuggling, etc. Act 1818	An Act passed in the Fifty eighth Year of the Reign of King George the Third, intituled An Act to subject Foreigners to Arrest and Detention for Smuggling within certain Distances of any of the Dominions of His Majesty; for regulating Rewards to the seizing Officers, according to the Tonnage of Vessels or Boats seized or condemned; and for the further Prevention of the Importation of Tea, without making due Entry thereof with the Officers of the Customs and Excise.	The whole act.
59 Geo. 3. c. 6	Apprehension of Smugglers Act 1819	An Act passed in the Fifty eighth Year of the Reign of King George the Third, intituled An Act to enable His Majesty to direct the Distribution of any Reward awarded by the Commissioners of the Customs or Excise to the Officers of the Army, Navy or Marines, for apprehending Smugglers, in such Manner as His Majesty shall be pleased to appoint.	The whole act.
59 Geo. 3. c. 39	Payments into Receipt of the Exchequer Act 1819	An Act passed in the Fifty ninth Year of the Reign of King George the Third, intituled An Act for the more frequent Payment into the Receipt of the Exchequer at Westminster of Monies arising from the Duties of Customs, Excise, Stamps and Postage in England.	As regards Payment to be made by the Receiver General of the Duties of Customs in Great Britain.
59 Geo. 3. c. 52	Customs (No. 3) Act 1819	An Act passed in the Fifty ninth Year of the Reign of King George the Third, intituled An Act to repeal several Duties of Customs chargeable in Great Britain, and to grant other Duties in lieu thereof.	The whole act.
59 Geo. 3. c. 74	Importation, etc. (No. 2) Act 1819	An Act passed in the Fifty ninth Year of the Reign of King George the Third, intituled An Act to allow the Importation of Tobacco from the East Indies and other Places; and for continuing the Exportation of Tobacco from Great Britain, and the Importation thereof into Ireland, in Vessels of Seventy Tons Burthen and upwards.	The whole act.
59 Geo. 3. c. 78	Customs (No. 4) Act 1819	An Act passed in the Fifty ninth Year of the Reign of King George the Third, intituled An Act for transferring the Duty of the Supervisor of the Receiver General's Receipts and Payments to the Comptroller General of the Customs in England.	The whole act.
59 Geo. 3. c. 121	Smuggling Act 1819	An Act passed in the Fifty ninth Year of the Reign of King George the Third, intituled An Act to make further Regulations for the Prevention of Smuggling.	The whole act.
59 Geo. 3. c. 123	Customs (No. 6) Act 1819	An Act passed in the Fifty ninth Year of the Reign of King George the Third, intituled An Act to empower the Officers of the Customs in Great Britain to allow Exports of Vessels' Cargoes to be amended; to require Goods which have been warehoused without Payment of Duties, or being prohibited, warehoused for Exportation, to be put on board Vessels licensed for that Purpose; to direct that Cocquet and Bond shall be required for Slate and Stone carried coastwise; and to empower Officers of the Customs to administer Oaths.	The whole act.
59 Geo. 3. c. 125	Importation and Exportation Act 1819	An Act passed in the Fifty ninth Year of the Reign of King George the Third, intituled An Act to admit certain Goods imported from the East Indies to Entry and Payment of Duty without being warehoused, and to permit the Exportation of certain East India Goods to Liverpool, Lancaster, Bristol and Glasgow, for Exportation.	The whole act.
59 Geo. 3. c. 126	Drawback on Coals Act 1819	An Act passed in the Fifty ninth Year of the Reign of King George the Third, intituled An Act for requiring the Proof, to obtain Drawback of Duty on Coals used or consumed in calcining or smelting Tin, Copper or Lead Ores, in the Counties of Devon and Cornwall, as is required on Coals used in Mines of Tin, Copper or Lead, in the said Counties.	The whole act.
1 Geo. 4. c. 7	Customs Act 1820	An Act passed in the First Year of the Reign of His present Majesty, intituled An Act to repeal so much of several Acts, as requires Bonds to be given to His Majesty in certain Cases, and the taking of certain Oaths in Matters relating to the Revenue of Customs, and to prevent Fees being offered or given to Officers of the Customs.	The whole act.
1 Geo. 4. c. 8	Customs (No. 2) Act 1820	An Act passed in the First Year of the Reign of His present Majesty, intituled An Act to allow a Drawback on Goods, Wares and Merchandize imported into any British Colony or Plantation in America, on the Exportation thereof to any Foreign Country to which they may be legally exported.	The whole act.
1 Geo. 4. c. 14	Gold Plate (Exportation) Act 1820	An Act passed in the First Year of the Reign of His present Majesty, intituled An Act to repeal the Drawback on certain Gold Articles exported, and to permit the Exportation of Cordage entitled to Bounty, free from Right of Pre-emption by the Commissioners of the Navy.	As relates to the Exportation of Cordage.
1 Geo. 4. c. 34	Importation etc. (Demerara etc.) Act 1820	An Act passed in the First Year of the Reign of His present Majesty, intituled An Act for the further continuing, until the First Day of January One thousand eight hundred and twenty six, so much of an Act passed in the Fifty sixth Year of His late Majesty as permits Subjects of His Majesty the King of the Netherlands to import and export certain Articles into and from the Colonies of Demerara, Berbice and Essequibo, in Ships not of the Built of His said Majesty's Dominions.	The whole act.
1 Geo. 4. c. 43	Smuggling etc. Act 1820	An Act passed in the First Year of the Reign of His present Majesty, intituled, An Act to amend the Laws relating to Smuggling and the Coasting Trade in Great Britain.	The whole act.
1 Geo. 4. c. 61	Import Duties etc. (Isle of Man) Act 1820	An Act passed in the First Year of the Reign of His present Majesty, intituled An Act to charge additional Duties on the Importation of certain Articles into the Isle of Man, and to regulate the Trade of the said Island.	The whole act.
1 & 2 Geo. 4. c. 37	Customs Act 1821	An Act passed in the First and Second Years of the Reign of His present Majesty, intituled An Act to repeal the Duties of Customs on the Importation into Great Britain of certain Sorts of Wood and Timber, and certain Drawbacks or Allowances in respect of such Duties, and to grant other Drawbacks in lieu thereof.	The whole act.
1 & 2 Geo. 4. c. 67	Drawbacks on Coals, etc. Act 1821	An Act passed in the First and Second Years of the Reign of His present Majesty, intituled An Act for extending the Drawbacks on Coals used in Mines and Smelting Works within the Counties of Cornwall and Devon; and for allowing a Drawback of the Duties on Coals used in draining Coal Mines in the County of Pembroke.	The whole act.
1 & 2 Geo. 4. c. 75	Frauds by Boatmen, etc. Act 1821	An Act passed in the First and Second Years of the Reign of His present Majesty, intituled An Act to continue and amend certain Acts for preventing Frauds and Depredations committed on Merchants, Ship Owners and Underwriters, by Boatmen and others; and also for remedying certain Defects relative to the Adjustment of Salvage in England, under an Act made in the Twelfth Year of Queen Anne.	As relates to the Sale of Goods Duty free to pay the Expenses of Salvage and other Charges. I.e., section 38
1 & 2 Geo. 4. c. 76	Cinque Ports Act 1821	An Act passed in the First and Second Years of the Reign of His present Majesty, intituled An Act to continue and amend certain Acts for preventing the various Frauds and Depredations committed on Merchants, Ship Owners and Underwriters, by Boatmen and others, within the Jurisdiction of the Cinque Ports; and also for remedying certain Defects relative to the Adjustment of Salvage under a Statute made in the Twelfth Year of the Reign of Her late Majesty Queen Anne.	As relates to the Sale of Goods Duty free to pay the Expenses of Salvage and other Charges. I.e., section 20.
1 & 2 Geo. 4. c. 84	Duties on Wood, etc. (Great Britain) Act 1821	An Act made in the First and Second Years of the Reign of His present Majesty, intituled An Act to grant Duties of Custom on certain Articles of Wood imported into Great Britain in lieu of former Duties, and to amend an Act made in the Fifty ninth Year of his late Majesty, for granting certain Duties of Customs in Great Britain.	The whole act.
1 & 2 Geo. 4. c. 94	Importation (No. 2) Act 1821	An Act passed in the First and Second Years of the Reign of His present Majesty, intituled An Act to regulate the Importation of Rum into the Islands of Guernsey, Jersey and Sark.	The whole act.
1 & 2 Geo. 4. c. 97	Coasting Trade (Great Britain) Act 1821	An Act passed in the First and Second Years of the Reign of His present Majesty, intituled An Act to amend several Acts relating to the Coasting Trade of Great Britain.	The whole act.
1 & 2 Geo. 4. c. 104	Importation, Isle of Man Act 1821	An Act passed in the First and Second Years of the Reign of His present Majesty, intituled An Act to amend an Act of the last Session of Parliament for regulating the Trade of the Isle of Man, so far as relates to the Quantity of Muscovado Sugar to be imported into the said Island.	The whole act.
3 Geo. 4. c. 28	Bounties on British and Irish Linens Act 1822	An Act passed in the Third Year of the Reign of His present Majesty, intituled An Act to continue so long as the Bounties now payable on Irish Linens when exported from Ireland shall continue, the Bounties on British and Irish Linens exported.	The whole act.
3 Geo. 4. c. 43	Navigation and Commerce Act 1822	An Act passed in the Third Year of the Reign of His present Majesty, intituled An Act for the Encouragement of Navigation and Commerce, by regulating the Importation of Goods and Merchandize, so far as relates to the Countries or Places from whence, and the Ships in which such Importation shall be made.	The whole act.
3 Geo. 4. c. 44	Trade Act 1822	An Act passed in the Third Year of the Reign of His present Majesty, intituled An Act to regulate the Trade between His Majesty's Possessions in America and the West Indies, and other Places in America and the West Indies.	The whole act.
3 Geo. 4. c. 45	Trade Act (No. 2) 1822	An Act passed in the Third Year of the Reign of His present Majesty, intituled An Act to regulate the Trade between His Majesty's Possessions in America and the West Indies, and other Parts of the World.	The whole act.
3 Geo. 4. c. 107	Duties on Brimstone Act 1822	An Act passed in the Third Year of the Reign of His present Majesty, intituled An Act to allow, until the First of August One thousand eight hundred and twenty three, a Drawback of the whole of the Duties of Customs on Brimstone used and consumed in the making and preparing Oil of Vitriol and Sulphuric Acid.	The whole act.
3 Geo. 4. c. 110	Smuggling Act 1822	An Act passed in the Third Year of the Reign of His present Majesty, intituled An Act to amend the Laws for the Prevention of Smuggling.	The whole act.
3 Geo. 4. c. 119	British North America (Trade and Lands) Act 1822	An Act passed in the Third Year of the Reign of His present Majesty, intituled An Act to regulate the Trade of the provinces of Lower and Upper Canada, and for other Purposes relating to the said Provinces.	As relates to the Trade between those Provinces and the United States of America.
4 Geo. 4. c. 2	Trade, American Colonies and West Indies Act 1823	An Act passed in the Fourth Year of the Reign of His present Majesty, intituled An Act to amend an Act of the last Session of Parliament, for regulating the Trade between His Majesty's Possessions in America and the West India Islands, and other Parts of the World.	The whole act.
4 Geo. 4. c. 23	Customs and Excise Act 1823	An Act made in the Fourth Year of the Reign of His present Majesty, intituled An Act to consolidate the several Boards of Customs, and to regulate the several Boards of Excise of Great Britain and Ireland.	As relates to the Board of Customs.
4 Geo. 4. c. 24	Warehousing of Goods Act 1823	An Act passed in the Fourth Year of His present Majesty, intituled An Act to make more effectual Provision for permitting Goods imported to be secured in Warehouses or other Places without the Payment of Duty on the First Entry thereof.	The whole act.
4 Geo. 4. c. 25	Merchant Seamen, etc. Act 1823	An Act passed in the Fourth Year of the Reign of His present Majesty, intituled An Act for regulating the Number of Apprentices to be taken on board British Merchant Vessels, and for preventing the Desertion of Seamen therefrom.	The whole act. (Note: This act was revived by the Customs Act 1826 (7 Geo. 4 c. 48).)
4 Geo. 4. c. 26	Importation Act 1823	An Act passed in the Fourth Year of the Reign of His present Majesty, intituled An Act to repeal the Duties on certain Articles, and to provide for the gradual Discontinuance of the Duties on certain other Articles, the Manufacture of Great Britain and Ireland respectively, on the Importation into either Country from the other.	The whole act.
4 Geo. 4. c. 30	Countervening Duties of Excise Act 1823	An Act passed in the Fourth Year of the Reign of His present Majesty, intituled An Act to regulate the Importation and Exportation of certain Articles subject to Duties of Excise, and certain other Articles, the Produce and Manufacture of Great Britain and Ireland respectively, into and from either Country from and to the other.	The whole act. (Note: This act was revived by the Customs Act 1826 (7 Geo. 4 c. 48).) (Note: The whole act was repealed by the Statute Law Revision Act 1873. The Notes to the Statute Law Revision Act 1873 state "Repealed by 6 Geo. 4. c. 105, but so much as relates to the Excise revived by 7 Geo. 4. c. 48. s. 59. The Inland Revenue Department, however, say that the Act has not now any operation. See letters from In- land Revenue Office, 3rd March and 10th April 1875.")
4 Geo. 4. c. 39	Customs Act 1823	An Act passed in the Fourth Year of the Reign of His present Majesty, intituled An Act to continue an Act of the last Session of Parliament, for allowing a Drawback of the whole Duty of Customs on Brimstone used and consumed in Great Britain in the making or preparing Oil of Vitriol or Sulphuric Acid.	The whole act.
4 Geo. 4. c. 41	Registering of Vessels Act 1823	An Act passed in the Fourth Year of the Reign of His present Majesty, intituled An Act for the registering of Vessels.	The whole act.
4 Geo. 4. c. 44	Duties, etc., on Barilla Act 1823	An Act passed in the Fourth Year of the Reign of His present Majesty, intituled An Act to repeal the Duties and Drawbacks on Barilla imported into this Kingdom, and to grant other Duties in lieu thereof.	The whole act.
4 Geo. 4. c. 66	Importation and Exportation Act 1823	An Act passed in the Fourth Year of the Reign of His present Majesty, intituled An Act to authorize, in certain Cases, the Reduction of the Duties payable in Ireland, and the Alteration of the Duties and Drawbacks on the Importation and Exportation of Goods between Great Britain and Ireland.	The whole act.
4 Geo. 4. c. 69	Customs (No. 2) Act 1823	An Act passed in the Fourth Year of the Reign of His present Majesty, intituled An Act to repeal certain Duties of Customs in Great Britain, and to grant other Duties in lieu thereof; and to grant certain Bounties on Salted Provisions and Silk Manufactures exported; and to make more effectual Regulations for collecting the Duties of Customs.	The whole act.
4 Geo. 4. c. 84	Passenger Vessels Act 1823	An Act passed in the Fourth Year of the Reign of His present Majesty, intituled An Act to repeal the Laws for regulating Vessels carrying Passengers from the United Kingdom to Foreign Parts, and to make other Provisions in lieu thereof.	The whole act.
5 Geo. 4. c. 21	Silk Manufacturers Act 1824	An Act passed in the last Session of Parliament, intituled An Act to reduce the Duties on Importation of Raw or Thrown Silk, and to repeal the Prohibition on the Importation of Silk Manufactures, and to grant certain Duties thereon.	The whole act.
5 Geo. 4. c. 22	Repeal of Certain Duties Act 1824	An Act passed in the last Session of Parliament, intituled An Act to repeal the Duties on all Articles the Manufacture of Great Britain and Ireland respectively, on their Importation into either Country from the other.	The whole act. (Note: The whole act was repealed by the Statute Law Revision Act 1873. The Notes to the Statute Law Revision Act 1873 state "Spent. [Repealed by 6 Geo. 4. c. 105., but repeal inoperative in consequence of the saving in s. 3. of the repealing [6 Geo. 4]. c. 105, so far as they repealed any former Acts.]")
5 Geo. 4. c. 34	Duties on Colonial Rum Act 1824	An Act passed in the last Session of Parliament, intituled An Act to reduce the Duties on Rum, the Produce of the British Colonies or Plantations in America, imported into the United Kingdom.	The whole act.
5 Geo. 4. c. 35	Refined Sugar Bounties Act 1824	An Act passed in the last Session of Parliament, intituled An Act to continue, until the Fifth Day of July One thousand eight hundred and twenty five, the Acts for granting Bounties on the Exportation of Refined Sugar from the United Kingdom; and for reducing the Size of the Packages in which Refined Sugar may be exported.	The whole act.
5 Geo. 4. c. 43	Coal Duties, etc. Act 1824	An Act passed in the last Session of Parliament, intituled An Act to alter the Duties on the Importation of certain Articles, and also the Duties on Coal brought to London; to repeal the Bounties on Linens exported; and to amend the Acts relating to the Customs.	The whole act.
5 Geo. 4. c. 46	Duties on Coals Act 1824	An Act passed in the last Session of Parliament, intituled An Act to continue, until the Fifth Day of July One thousand eight hundred and twenty six, the low Duties on Coals and Culm carried coastwise to any Port within the Principality of Wales.	The whole act.
5 Geo. 4. c. 47	Wool Duties, etc. Act 1824	An Act passed in the last Session of Parliament, intituled An Act to alter the Laws relating to the Duties on the Importation, and the Prohibition on the Exportation of Wool, and of Hare and Coney Skins.	The whole act.
5 Geo. 4. c. 65	Repeal of Salt Duties Act 1824	An Act passed in the last Session of Parliament, intituled An Act to repeal the Duties and Laws in respect of Salt and Rock Salt.	As relates to the Revenue of Customs.
5 Geo. 4. c. 76	Duties on East India Goods, etc. Act 1824	An Act passed in the last Session of Parliament, intituled An Act to continue several Acts for establishing Regulations for the Security of the Revenue on Goods imported from Places within the Limits of the Charter granted to the East India Company; and to grant, until the Twenty fifth of March One thousand eight hundred and twenty five, Duties on Sugar imported from Places within the Limits of the said Charter, in lieu of former Duties.	The whole act.
5 Geo. 4. c. 79	Oath, Revenue Officers Act 1824	An Act passed in the last Session of Parliament, intituled An Act to enable certain Persons to receive and hold Offices in the Management, Collection and Receipt of the Revenue, without taking or subscribing certain Oaths and Declarations.	As relates to the Commissioners and Officers of the Customs.
5 Geo. 4. c. 88	East India Company Act 1824	An Act passed in the last Session of Parliament, intituled An Act to authorize the East India Company to trade direct from China to the British Colonies and Plantations in America.	The whole act.
5 Geo. 4. c. 94	Prosecution by Customs or Excise Act 1824	An Act passed in the last Session of Parliament, intituled An Act to allow the Averment of the Order for Prosecution by Commissioners of Customs or Excise to be sufficient Proof of the Order having been given.	As relates to the Commissioners or Revenue of the Customs.

=== For Ireland ===
Citation	Short title	Title	Extent of repeal
25 Hen. 6. c. 3 (I)	N/A	One Act made in the Twenty fifth Year of the Reign of King Henry the Sixth, intituled An Act that none shall take Custom but within Cities, Boroughs or Merchant Towns where there is Authority to take Customs.	The whole act.
25 Hen. 6. c. 10 (I)	N/A	An Act made in the Twenty fifth Year of the Reign of King Henry the Sixth, intituled An Act restraining the Transportation of Bullion.	The whole act.
35 Hen. 6. c. 1 (I)	N/A	An Act made in the Thirty fifth Year of the Reign of the said King Henry the Sixth, intituled An Act that Frenchmen, Spaniards, Britons, Portingales and other Nations coming out of other Lands with Merchandizes, shall pay for every Pound of Silver that they carry out of the Land, Forty Pence of Custom to the King's Customer.	The whole act.
28 Hen. 8. c. 22 (I)	Inland Navigation Act 1537	An Act made in the Twenty eighth Year of the Reign of King Henry the Eighth, intituled An Act for the Wears upon the Barrow and other Waters in the County of Kilkenny.	As prohibits taking any Custom of any Boat or other Vessel passing or repassing in or through any of the Rivers or Waters mentioned in the said Act, or of the Wares of any Goods, Merchandize, Victual or Stuff in any such Boat or Vessel.
10 & 11 Chas. 1. c. 11 (I). s. 5	Common Informers Act 1634	An Act made in the Tenth and Eleventh Years of the Reign of King Charles the First, intituled An Act for the Ease of the Subject concerning Informations upon Penal Statutes.	As relates to Customs, Tonnage, Poundage, Subsidy, Impost or Prisage.
14 & 15 Chas. 2 Sess. 4. c. 9 (I)	Customs Act 1662	An Act made in the Fourteenth and Fifteenth Years of the Reign of King Charles the Second, intituled An Act for the settling the Subsidy of Poundage, and granting a Subsidy of Tonnage, and other Sums of Money, unto His Royal Majesty, His Heirs and Successors, the same to be paid upon Merchandizes imported and exported into and out of the Kingdom of Ireland, according to a Book of Rates hereunto annexed.	The whole act.
17 & 18 Chas. 2. c. 12 (I). s. 2	N/A	An Act passed in the Seventeenth and Eighteenth Years of the Reign of King Charles the Second, intituled An Act to prevent Arrests of Judgment and superseding Executions.	As relates to Customs and Subsidies of Tonnage and Poundage.
4 Anne c. 7 (I)	N/A	An Act made in the Fourth Year of the Reign of Queen Anne, intituled An Act for lessening the Duty on Rape Seed to be exported.	The whole act.
33 Geo. 2. c. 14 (I)	N/A	An Act made in the Thirty third Year of the Reign of King George the Second, intituled An Act for repealing an Act passed in this Kingdom in the Eighth Year of the Reign of King George the First, intituled 'An Act for the better securing the Payment of Bankers' Notes,' and for providing a more effectual Remedy for the Security and Payment of Debts due by Bankers.	Whereby it is enacted, that no Person who, by reason of any Office, Employment, Deputation or Clerkship, should at any Time be entrusted with the Receipt, Custody or Payment of Public Money, or any Part of the Public Revenue, shall, either singly or in Partnership, so long as such Person shall continue in such Office, Employment, Deputation or Clerkship, follow the Trade or Business of a Banker, or by himself, or any other Person authorized by him, issue or give any Note or accountable Receipt as a Banker, or in Partnership with any Banker, or for Promise or Reward discount any Promissory Note or Inland Bill of Exchange, so far as the last recited Act, and the Provisions therein contained, relate to any Person holding any Office, Employment, Deputation or Clerkship in the Revenue of Customs in Ireland. I.e., section 15.
21 & 22 Geo. 3. c. 20 (I)	State Debts Act 1781	An Act made in the Twenty first and Twenty second Years of the Reign of His said late Majesty King George the Third, intituled An Act for the more speedy and effectual Recovery of the King's Debts.	As relates to the Customers, Collectors or Receivers of Customs and Subsidies. I.e., section 23
27 Geo. 3. c. 23 (I)	Registry of Ships Act 1787	An Act made in the Twenty seventh Year of the Reign of His said late Majesty King George the Third, intituled An Act for the further Increase and Encouragement of Shipping and Navigation.	The whole act.
27 Geo. 3. c. 28 (I)	Regulation of Manifests Act 1787	An Act made in the Twenty seventh Year of the Reign of His said late Majesty King George the Third, intituled An Act for regulating the Production of Manifests; and for more effectually preventing fraudulent Practices in obtaining Bounties and Drawbacks, and in the clandestine relanding Goods.	The whole act.
37 Geo. 3. c. 42 (I)	Tobacco Act 1797	An Act made in the Thirty seventh Year of His late Majesty's Reign, intituled An Act for regulating and extending the Tobacco Trade, and for securing the Duties payable upon the Import and Manufacture of Tobacco.	As relates to the Duties of Customs upon Tobacco.
40 Geo. 3. c. 77 (I)	Tobacco Act 1800	An Act made in the Fortieth Year of His said late Majesty's Reign, for amending and continuing the said last recited Act of the Thirty seventh Year of His said late Majesty's Reign.	As relates to the Duties of Customs on Tobacco.
37 Geo. 3. c. 52 (I)	Coffee Act 1797	An Act made in the said Thirty seventh Year of His said late Majesty's Reign, intituled An Act for regulating the Import, Export and Sale of Coffee, and securing the Duties payable thereon.	As relates to the Duties of Customs on Coffee.
40 Geo. 3. c. 20	N/A	An Act made in the Fortieth Year of the Reign of His said late Majesty King George the Third, for regulating the Payment of Bounties on the Exportation of certain Manufactures of Ireland.	The whole act.
43 Geo. 3. c. 25	Parliamentary Elections (Ireland) Act 1803	An Act made in the Forty third Year of the Reign of His said late Majesty King George the Third, intituled An Act for the better securing the Freedom of Elections of Members to serve in Parliament for any Place in Ireland, by disabling certain Officers employed in the Collection or Management of His Majesty's Revenues in Ireland from giving their Votes at such Elections.	The whole act. (Note: This act was revived by the Customs Act 1826 (7 Geo. 4 c. 48).)
45 Geo. 3. c. 153	Importation in Neutral Vessel, etc. Act 1803	An Act made in the Forty third Year of the Reign of King George the Third, intituled An Act to permit, during the Continuance of Hostilities, and until Six Months after the Ratification of a Definitive Treaty of Peace, the Importation into Great Britain and Ireland, in Neutral Vessels, from States in Amity with His Majesty, of certain Wares, Goods and Merchandise; and to empower His Majesty by Order in Council to prohibit the Exportation of Copper, and to permit the Importation in Neutral Vessels, from States not in Amity with His Majesty, of certain Goods, Wares and Merchandise.	As shall be in force immediately before the passing of this Act.
44 Geo. 3. c. 57	Export Duty Act 1804	An Act made in the Forty fourth Year of the Reign of King George the Third, intituled An Act to exempt from Duties on Export of Linens of the Manufacture of the United Kingdom.	The whole act.
45 Geo. 3. c. 18	Customs Act 1805	An Act for granting to His Majesty, until the Twenty fifth Day of March One thousand eight hundred and six, certain Rates and Duties, and to allow certain Drawbacks and Bounties, upon Goods, Wares and Merchandise imported into and exported from Ireland, in lieu of former Rates and Duties, Drawbacks and Bounties.	As shall be in force immediately before the passing of this Act. (Note: The whole act was repealed by the Statute Law Revision Act 1872. The Notes to the Statute Law Revision Act 1872 state "Repealed in part by— 55 Geo. 3. c. 24. s. 1. 55 Geo. 3. c. 183. 57 Geo. 3. c. 86. s. 1. Residue repealed by 6 Geo. 4. c. 105., except perhaps as to Sched. D., but if so repealed as to that schedule the repeal seems to have been modified by 7 Geo. 4. c. 48. s. 32. so as to set up that schedule, which however is now virtually repealed by 24 & 25 Vict. c. 47. s. 21. [Continued by 56 Geo. 3. c. 12. s. 1. Perpetuated in part by 54 Geo. 3. c. 129. ss. 31, 33. Continued in part by 3 Geo. 4. c. 99. s. 1. Incorporated by 4 Geo. 4. c. 72. s. 43.]")
45 Geo. 3. c. 108	Customs and Excise (Ireland) Act 1805	An Act made in the said Forty fifth Year of the Reign of His said late Majesty, intituled An Act to continue, until the Twenty ninth of September One thousand eight hundred and six, several Acts for the better Collection and Security of the Revenues of Customs and Excise in Ireland, and for preventing Frauds therein.	The whole act. (Note: The whole act was repealed by the Statute Law Revision Act 1872. The notes to the Statute Law Revision Act 1872 state "Repealed by 6 Geo. 4. c. 105., but from the qualifying terms of the repeal it may be doubtful whether this act is wholly repealed. So far as not so repealed, expired.")
46 Geo. 3. c. 29	Continuance of Laws Act 1806	An Act passed in the Forty sixth Year of the Reign of King George the Third, among other Things, for continuing several Laws relating to the granting a Bounty upon certain Species of British and Irish Linens exported from Great Britain, and for reviving and continuing several Laws relating to the regulating the Prices at which Corn and Grain may be exported from Great Britain to Ireland, and from Ireland to Great Britain, and to the prohibiting the Exportation from Ireland of Corn or Potatoes, or other Provisions, and to the permitting the Importation into Ireland of Corn, Fish and Provisions, without Payment of Duty; and for reviving and continuing an Act of the Parliament of Ireland, for the Encouragement of the Flaxen and Hempen Manufactures of Ireland.	As continues certain Duties on certain Callicoes, Muslins and Linens imported into Ireland, and as shall be in force at the Time of the passing of this Act, with relation to any Duties of Customs in Ireland. I.e., section 11
46 Geo. 3. c. 58	Customs and Excise (Ireland) Act 1806	An Act passed in the said Forty sixth Year of the Reign of King George the Third, intituled An Act for establishing certain Regulations in the Collection and Management of His Majesty's Revenues of Customs, Excise and Taxes, in Ireland.	As relates to the said Revenues of Customs.
46 Geo. 3. c. 87	Customs (Ireland) Act 1806	An Act made in the said Forty sixth Year of the Reign of King George the Third, intituled An Act more effectually to regulate the Collection of the Duties on Goods, Wares and Merchandise imported or exported into or from Ireland, and the Payment of Bounties, Allowances and Drawbacks thereon.	As relates to the Revenues of Customs.
46 Geo. 3. c. 106	Revenue (Ireland) Act 1806	An Act made in the said Forty sixth Year of the Reign of King George the Third, intituled An Act to provide for the better Execution of the several Acts relating to the Revenues, Matters and Things under the Management of the Commissioners of Customs and Port Duties, and of the Commissioners of Inland Excise and Taxes, in Ireland.	As relates to the Revenues of Customs.
46 Geo. 3. c. 120	Duties, Bounties, etc. (Ireland) Act 1806	An Act made in the Forty sixth Year of the Reign of King George the Third, among other Things, for continuing several Acts for granting Rates and Duties, and allowing Drawbacks and Bounties on Goods, Wares and Merchandise imported into and exported from Ireland.	Whereby it is enacted, that whenever any Article is by Law entitled to a Bounty on the Importation or Exportation thereof, no Duty shall be paid on the Importation or Exportation of any Article on which such Duty shall be paid and allowed. I.e., section 3.
47 Geo. 3 Sess. 2. c. 16	Importation and Exportation (Ireland) (No. 2) Act 1807	An Act made in the said Forty seventh Year of the Reign of King George the Third, intituled An Act to grant to His Majesty, until the Fifth Day of July One thousand eight hundred and eight, certain Duties on the Importation, and to allow Drawbacks on the Exportation of certain Goods, Wares and Merchandise, into and from Ireland.	As shall be in force at the Time of the passing of this act, relating to the Revenues of Customs.
47 Geo. 3 Sess. 2. c. 58	Exportation (Ireland) Act 1807	An Act made in the said Forty seventh Year of the Reign of King George the Third, intituled An Act for encouraging the Exportation of Salt from Ireland.	The whole act.
47 Geo. 3 Sess. 2. c. 61	Customs (No. 2) Act 1807	An Act made in the said Forty seventh Year of the Reign of King George the Third, intituled An Act to repeal certain Duties on Foreign Goods, Wares and Merchandise, exported from Great Britain to Ireland.	The whole act.
48 Geo. 3. c. 44	Exportation Act 1808	An Act made in the said Forty eighth Year of the Reign of King George the Third, intituled An Act to prevent the Exportation of Wool to Ireland before Bond given for the due landing thereof.	The whole act.
48 Geo. 3. c. 56	Customs (No. 4) Act 1808	An Act made in the said Forty eighth Year of His said late Majesty's Reign, intituled An Act for abolishing Fees received by Officers in the Service of the Customs in the several Ports of Ireland, and for regulating the Hours of Attendance and the Number of Holidays to be observed by the said Officers, and certain Officers of Excise.	As relates to the Officers of the Customs.
48 Geo. 3. c. 62	Customs and Excise (Ireland) Act 1808	An Act made in the Forty eighth Year of the Reign of King George the Third, intituled An Act for the making perpetual several Acts for the better Collection and Security of the Revenues of Customs and Excise in Ireland, and for preventing Frauds therein, and to make further Provision for the Security of the said Revenues, and for the Execution of the several Acts relating thereto.	As relates to the said Revenue of Customs.
49 Geo. 3. c. 99	Prize Goods Act 1808	An Act made in the Forty ninth Year of the Reign of King George the Third, intituled An Act to amend the several Acts for regulating and securing the Collection of the Duties on Spirits distilled in Ireland, and for regulating the Sale of such Liquors by Retail.	As relates to the Importation into Ireland of Stills, or Metal prepared for Stills.
49 Geo. 3. c. 116	Postage (No. 2) Act 1808	An Act made in the said Forty ninth Year of the Reign of King George the Third, intituled An Act to make further Provision for the Execution of the several Acts relating to the Revenues, Matters and Things under the Management of the Commissioners of Customs and Port Duties, and of the Commissioners of Inland Excise and Taxes, in Ireland.	As relates to the Duties of Customs.
51 Geo. 3. c. 58	Importation (No. 2) Act 1811	An Act made in the Fifty first Year of the Reign of King George the Third, intituled An Act to allow the free Importation between Great Britain and Ireland of Home made Chocolate; to prohibit the Importation of Foreign Chocolate into Ireland, so long as the same shall be prohibited in Great Britain; and to grant certain Duties on Cocoa Nuts imported into Ireland.	As shall be in force immediately before the passing of this act.
52 Geo. 3. c. 76	Customs, etc. (Ireland) Act 1812	An Act made in the Fifty second Year of the Reign of King George the Third, intituled An Act to amend several Acts relating to the Revenue of Customs and Port Duties in Ireland.	The whole act.
53 Geo. 3. c. 55	Trade of Canada Act 1812	An Act made in the Fifty third Year of the Reign of King George the Third, for continuing certain Rates, Duties and Drawbacks on Goods, Wares and Merchandise imported into and exported from Ireland.	As shall be immediately in force before the passing of this act.
54 Geo. 3. c. 81	Importation and Exportation Act 1814	An Act made in the Fifty fourth Year of the Reign of King George the Third, intituled An Act to continue, until the Fifth Day of July One thousand eight hundred and fifteen, and to amend several Acts for granting certain Rates and Duties, and for allowing certain Drawbacks and Bounties on Goods, Wares and Merchandize imported into and exported from Ireland; and to grant, until the said Fifth Day of July One thousand eight hundred and fifteen, certain new Duties on the Importation, and to allow Drawbacks on the Exportation of certain Goods, Wares and Merchandize into and from Ireland; and to make further Regulations for securing the Collection of the said Duties.	As shall be in force immediately before the passing of this Act. (Note: The whole act was repealed by the Statute Law Revision Act 1873. The notes to the Statute Law Revision Act 1873 state "Repealed by 6 Geo. 4. c. 105, but see — 6 Geo. 4. c 128. 7 Geo. 4. c. 48. s. 52. So far as not so repealed, virtually repealed by 24 & 25 Vict. c. 47. s. 21. [Duties under, repealed (other duties being substituted) by c. 129). of the same Session, s. 8. Repealed in part by 3 Geo. 4. c. 99. s. 8 (repealed by 5 Geo. 4. c. 65 s. 1])
54 Geo. 3. c. 103	Customs (No. 7) Act 1814	An Act made in the said Fifty fourth Year of the Reign of King George the Third, intituled An Act to grant, until the Tenth Day of April One thousand eight hundred and nineteen, certain Duties on Goods, Wares and Merchandise imported into Ireland from any Port or Place within the Limits of the Charter granted to the United Company of Merchants of England trading to the East Indies, and to establish further Regulations for the better Security of the Revenue on Goods so imported.	As shall be in force immediately before the passing of this act.
54 Geo. 3. c. 120	Customs and Excise Act 1814	An Act made in the said Fifty fourth Year of the Reign of King George the Third, intituled An Act to amend several Acts relating to the Revenues, Matters and Things under the Management of the Commissioners of Customs and Port Duties, and of the Commissioners of Inland Excise and Taxes, in Ireland.	As relates to the Duties of Customs.
54 Geo. 3. c. 129	Importation and Exportation (No. 2) Act 1814	An Act made in the Fifty fourth Year of the Reign of King George the Third, intituled An Act to grant to His Majesty certain Rates and Duties, and to allow Drawbacks and Bounties on certain Goods, Wares and Merchandise imported into and exported from Ireland, in lieu of former Rates and Duties, Drawbacks and Bounties.	As shall be in force immediately before the passing of this Act.
55 Geo. 3. c. 14	Customs (No. 9) Act 1814	An Act made in the Fifty fifth Year of the Reign of King George the Third, intituled An Act to impose certain Duties on the Importation, and to allow Drawbacks on the Exportation of certain Sorts of Wood into and from Ireland, in lieu of former Duties and Drawbacks on the like Sorts of Wood; and to indemnify Persons who have admitted certain Sorts of Wood to Entry on Payment of a Proportion only of the Duty imposed thereon.	As relates to the Duties imposed by the said Act.
55 Geo. 3. c. 24	Customs (Ireland) Act 1815	An Act of the said Fifty fifth Year of the Reign of King George the Third, intituled An Act to grant certain Duties of Customs on the Exportation of certain Goods, Wares and Merchandise from Ireland, in lieu of the Duties of Customs heretofore payable on such Exportation.	The whole act.
55 Geo. 3. c. 82	Customs, etc. Act 1815	An Act made in the said Fifty fifth Year of the Reign of King George the Third, intituled An Act to grant Duties of Customs and to allow Drawbacks and Bounties on certain Goods, Wares and Merchandise imported into and exported from Ireland, in lieu of former Duties, Drawbacks and Bounties; and to make further Regulations for securing the Duties of Customs in Ireland.	As shall be in force immediately before the passing of this Act.
55 Geo. 3. c. 83	Customs, etc. (No. 2) Act 1815	An Act made in the said Fifty fifth Year of the Reign of King George the Third, intituled An Act to regulate the Payment of the Duties of Customs on Foreign Goods imported into Great Britain from Ireland, or into Ireland from Great Britain.	The whole act.
55 Geo. 3. c. 144	Purchases for Docks, etc., Dublin Act 1815	An Act made in the said Fifty fifth Year of the Reign of King George the Third, intituled An Act to enable the Commissioners of Customs and Port Duties in Ireland to purchase Premises for the erecting additional Docks, Warehouses and Offices in Dublin.	The whole act.
56 Geo. 3. c. 20	Customs and Excise (Ireland) Act 1816	An Act made in the Fifty sixth Year of the Reign of King George the Third, intituled An Act to make further Provision for the Execution of the several Acts relating to the Revenues, Matters and Things under the Management of the Commissioners of Customs and Port Duties, and of the Commissioners of Inland Excise and Taxes, in Ireland.	As relates to the Duties of Customs.
56 Geo. 3. c. 85	Customs and Excise Act 1816	An Act made in the said Fifty sixth Year of the Reign of King George the Third, intituled An Act to make further Regulations for securing the Collection of the Duties of Customs and Excise in Ireland, and for the Importation into Ireland of American Staves, and of old Plate and Books from Great Britain.	As relates to the Duties of Customs.
57 Geo. 3. c. 73	Exportation (No. 4) Act 1817	An Act made in the Fifty seventh Year of the Reign of King George the Third, intituled An Act to allow the Exportation of Woollen and Bay Yarn from Ireland, by Licence obtained there.	The whole act.
59 Geo. 3. c. 73	Importation, etc. Act 1819	An Act made in the Fifty ninth Year of the Reign of King George the Third, intituled An Act to repeal several Acts requiring the Masters of Vessels carrying Certificate Goods to Ireland to take Duplicates of the Contents, prohibiting the Importation of certain wrought Goods, and the Exportation of Gun-powder when the Price shall exceed a certain Sum.	The whole act. (Note: The whole act was repealed by the Statute Law Revision Act 1873. The notes to the Statute Law Revision Act 1873 state "Repealed by 6 Geo. 4. c. 105, but the saving for repeals seems to render the repeal of this Act inoperative as it contains only repeals. [Referred to by 3 Geo. 4. c. 41. s. 10].")
59 Geo. 3. c. 82	Site for Docks, etc., Dublin Act 1819	An Act made in the said Fifty ninth Year of His said late Majesty's Reign, intituled An Act to amend an Act made in the Fifty fifth Year of the Reign of King George the Third, for enabling the Commissioners of Customs and Port Duties in Ireland to purchase Premises for erecting Docks, Warehouses and Offices in Dublin.	The whole act.
59 Geo. 3. c. 83	Customs (No. 5) Act 1819	An Act made in the said Fifty ninth Year of the Reign of King George the Third, intituled An Act to grant Duties of Customs and to allow Drawbacks on certain Goods, Wares and Merchandise imported into and exported from Ireland, in lieu of former Duties and Drawbacks on the like Articles; and to make further Regulations for securing the Duties of Customs in Ireland.	The whole act.
1 Geo. 4. c. 80	Sugar Duties (Ireland) Act 1820	An Act made in the First Year of the Reign of His present Majesty, intituled An Act allowing Importers of Sugar in Ireland to give Certificates for Sugar sold by them, in lieu of Permits.	The whole act.
1 & 2 Geo. 4. c. 19	Exportation Between Great Britain and Ireland Act 1821	An Act made in the Second Year of His present Majesty's Reign, intituled An Act to permit the Removal of certain Goods from Great Britain to Ireland, and from Ireland to Great Britain, by Cockets, Certificates, Let Pass or Transire.	The whole act.
1 & 2 Geo. 4. c. 103	Goods Sold Under Warehousing Acts Act 1821	An Act made in the Second Year of His present Majesty's Reign, intituled An Act to authorize the Collectors of Customs in Ireland to bring to Account the Proceeds of Goods sold under the Provisions of the Warehousing Act.	The whole act.
4 Geo. 4. c. 72	Customs Duties (Ireland) Act 1823	An Act made in the Fourth Year of His present Majesty's Reign, intituled An Act to repeal the several Duties and Drawbacks chargeable and allowable in Ireland on the Importation and Exportation of certain Foreign and Colonial Goods, Wares and Merchandise, and to grant other Duties and Drawbacks in lieu thereof, equal to the Duties and Drawbacks chargeable and allowable thereon in Great Britain.	As relates to the Revenue of Customs.

== See also ==
- Statute Law Revision Act
