= Merchant Shipping Repeal Act 1854 =

Act of the Parliament of the United Kingdom

Merchant Shipping Repeal Act 1854 (Note: Section 2.)
- Act of Parliament
- Parliament of the United Kingdom
- Long title: An Act to repeal certain Acts and Parts of Acts relating to Merchant Shipping, and to continue certain Provisions in the said Acts.
- Citation: 17 & 18 Vict. c. 120
- Introduced by: Edward Cardwell MP (Commons)
- Territorial extent: United Kingdom

Dates
- Royal assent: 11 August 1854
- Commencement: 1 May 1855 (Note: Section 3.)
Other legislation
Amends	See § Repealed enactments
Repeals/revokes	See § Repealed enactments
Amended by	Statute Law Revision Act 1875; Statute Law Revision Act 1892; Merchant Shipping Act 1894; Statute Law Revision Act 1950; Statute Law Revision Act 1963; Merchant Shipping (Registration, etc.) Act 1993; Merchant Shipping Act 1995
Relates to	Customs Law Repeal Act 1825; Customs Act 1826; Excise Management Act 1827; Customs (Repeal) Act 1833; Merchant Seamen Act 1835; Merchant Seamen Act 1844; Customs (Repeal) Act 1845; Wreck and Salvage Act 1846; Customs Consolidation Act 1853; Merchant Shipping Act 1854; Supplemental Customs Consolidation Act 1855; Customs Consolidation Act 1876; Merchant Shipping Act 1894; Statute Law Revision Act 1950

Status: Partially repealed

History of passage through Parliament

Records of Parliamentary debate relating to the statute from Hansard

Text of statute as originally enacted

Revised text of statute as amended

Text of the Merchant Shipping Repeal Act 1854 as in force today (including any amendments) within the United Kingdom, from legislation.gov.uk.

The Merchant Shipping Repeal Act 1854 (17 & 18 Vict. c. 120) is an act of the Parliament of the United Kingdom that repealed various enactments relating to merchant shipping in the United Kingdom.

== Background ==
In the United Kingdom, acts of Parliament remain in force until expressly repealed. Blackstone's Commentaries on the Laws of England, published in the late 18th-century, raised questions about the system and structure of the common law and the poor drafting and disorder of the existing statute book.

In 1806, the Commission on Public Records passed a resolution requesting the production of a report on the best mode of reducing the volume of the statute book. From 1810 to 1825, The Statutes of the Realm was published, providing for the first time the authoritative collection of acts.

By the early 19th century, British customs law, relating to trade, navigation, the import and export of goods, and the collection of customs revenue, had become increasingly intricate and difficult to navigate due to the large number of acts passed that had accumulated over many years. This complexity posed challenges for both commerce and law enforcement. The preamble of the act acknowledged that the existing system had become an impediment to trade and the "Ends of Justice".

In 1810, the Lords of the Treasury asked Nicholas Jickling to produce a Digest of the Laws of the Customs, which was published in 1815, numbering 1,375 pages from the earliest period to 53 Geo. 3. This Digest was continuously published to bring the state of the law up to date to the end of every session. In 1814, the Commission of Public Records published their 14th Report, recommending consolidation of the statute law.

In 1822, the Navigation and Commerce Act 1822 (3 Geo. 4. c. 43) was passed to encourage shipping and navigation. The Repeal of Acts Concerning Importation Act 1822 (c. 41) and the Repeal of Acts Concerning Importation (No. 2) Act 1822 ( c. 42) were passed at the same time to repealed related inconsistent or obsolete enactments.

In 1823, the Customs and Excise Act 1823 (4 Geo. 4. c. 23) was passed, which consolidated the several Boards of Customs, and also, the several Boards of Excise across the United Kingdom.

By a letter dated 9 August 1823, Secretary to the Treasury, John Charles Herries MP, asked J. D. Hume, Controller of the Port of London, to "undertake the preparation of a general law, or set of laws, for the consolidation of the customs of the United Kingdom".

The original plan for the consolidation was outlined in a letter dated November 18, 1824, from Mr. Herries, Secretary of the Treasury, to the Customs Commissioners, proposing: The plan proposed a two-pronged approach:

1. Specific repeal: Identifying and listing specific acts and parts of acts to be repealed, ensuring their removal from the statute book.
2. General description: Implementing a general repeal clause to address any potential omissions and provide legal clarity.

Despite the intention to create a new legal code that would supersede all previous customs laws, with a declaration that no law predating the new code would remain in force, the general repeal clause was withdrawn, the operation of the repeal of the enumerated acts was postponed for six months and full implementation of the new consolidated code was deferred to a future date.

On 15 April 1825, the Committee on Customs and Excise Consolidation Acts reported and resolved that it was "expedient to repeal the several Laws relating to the Customs now in force; and to consolidate the various enactments therein contained."

In 1826, eleven customs acts were passed to consolidate to all practical purposes the whole statute law of the customs by repealing the numerous existing customs statutes and replace them with new, more clearly written laws. The acts simplified tariff schedules, to make it easier for traders to understand duties, revised penalties for customs offences to ensure fair and consistent enforcement and introduced standardised procedures for customs declarations, to reduce administrative burdens and increase efficiency at ports.

- Customs, etc. Act 1825 (9 Geo. 4. c. 106)
- Customs, etc. (No. 2) Act 1825 (9 Geo. 4. c. 107)
- Customs, etc. (No. 3) Act 1825 (6 Geo. 4. c. 108)
- Customs, etc. (No. 4) Act 1825 (6 Geo. 4. c. 109)
- Customs, etc. (No. 5) Act 1825 (6 Geo. 4. c. 110)
- Customs, etc. (No. 6) Act 1825 (6 Geo. 4. c. 111)
- Customs, etc. (No. 7) Act 1825 (6 Geo. 4. c. 112)
- Customs, etc. (No. 8) Act 1825 (6 Geo. 4. c. 113)
- Customs, etc. (No. 9) Act 1825 (6 Geo. 4. c. 114)
- Customs, etc. (No. 10) Act 1825 (6 Geo. 4. c. 115)
- Passenger Vessels Act 1825 (6 Geo. 4 c. 116)

In 1825, the Customs Law Repeal Act 1825 (6 Geo. 4. c. 105) was passed to repeal 443 related enactments. In 1826, the Customs Act 1826 (7 Geo. 4. c. 48) was passed, which reversed the repeal of several enactments.

In 1827, the Excise Management Act 1827 (7 & 8 Geo. 4. c. 53) was passed, which consolidated enactments relating to the collection and management of customs.

In 1833, eleven customs acts were passed to further amend and consolidate the customs law:

- Customs, etc. Act 1833 (3 & 4 Will. 4. c. 51)
- Customs, etc. (No. 2) Act 1833 (3 & 4 Will. 4. c. 52)
- Customs, etc. (No. 3) Act 1833 (3 & 4 Will. 4. c. 53)
- Customs, etc. (No. 4) Act 1833 (3 & 4 Will. 4. c. 54)
- Customs, etc. (No. 5) Act 1833 (3 & 4 Will. 4. c. 55)
- Customs, etc. (No. 6) Act 1833 (3 & 4 Will. 4. c. 56)
- Customs, etc. (No. 7) Act 1833 (3 & 4 Will. 4. c. 57)
- Customs, etc. (No. 8) Act 1833 (3 & 4 Will. 4. c. 58)
- Customs, etc. (No. 9) Act 1833 (3 & 4 Will. 4. c. 59)
- Customs, etc. (No. 10) Act 1833 (3 & 4 Will. 4. c. 60)
- Customs, etc. (No. 11) Act 1833 (3 & 4 Will. 4. c. 61)

In 1833, the Customs (Repeal) Act 1833 (3 & 4 Will. 4. c. 50) was passed to repeal 24 related enactments.

In 1845, 10 customs acts were passed to further amend and consolidate the customs law:

- Commissioners of Customs Act 1845 (8 & 9 Vict. c. 85)
- Customs (No. 3) Act 1845 (8 & 9 Vict. c. 86)
- Prevention of Smuggling Act 1845 (8 & 9 Vict. c. 87)
- Shipping, etc. Act 1845 (8 & 9 Vict. c. 89)
- Registering of British Vessels Act 1845 (8 & 9 Vict. c. 90)
- Duties of Customs Act 1845 (8 & 9 Vict. c. 91)
- Warehousing of Goods Act 1845 (8 & 9 Vict. c. 92)
- Customs (No. 4) Act 1845 (8 & 9 Vict. c. 93)
- Trade of British Possessions Act 1845 (8 & 9 Vict. c. 94)
- Isle of Man Trade Act 1845 (8 & 9 Vict. c. 95)

In 1845, the Customs (Repeal) Act 1845 (8 & 9 Vict. c. 84) was passed to repeal 26 related enactments.

In 1853, the Customs Consolidation Act 1853 (16 & 17 Vict. c. 107) was passed, consolidating more customs enactments.

In 1854, the Merchant Shipping Act 1854 (17 & 18 Vict. c. 104) was passed to consolidate and amend the law relating to merchant shipping across several centuries of law, rendering old statutes redundant.

== Passage ==
The Merchant Shipping Acts Repeal Bill had its first reading in the House of Commons on 2 March 1854, presented by the President of the Board of Trade, Edward Cardwell MP. The bill had its second reading in the House of Commons on 18 March 1854 and was committed to a committee of the whole house, which met and reported on 1 July 1854 with amendments. The amended Bill was re-committed to a committee of the whole house, which met and reported on 10 July 1854, without amendments. The bill had its third reading in the House of Commons on 13 July 1854 and passed, without amendments.

The bill had its first reading in the House of Lords on 14 July 1854. The bill had its second reading in the House of Lords on 18 July 1854 and was committed to a Committee of the Whole House, which met and reported on 20 July 1854, without amendments. The bill had its third reading in the House of Lords on 8 August 1854 and passed, with amendments.

The amended bill was considered and agreed to by the House of Commons on 9 August 1854.

The bill was granted royal assent on 11 August 1854.

== Provisions ==
Section 1 of the act provided that the short title of the act is "The Merchant Shipping Repeal Act, 1854".

Section 2 of the act provided that the interpretation of terms in the Merchant Shipping Act (17 & 18 Vict. c. 104) act be incorporated into the act.

Section 3 of the act provided that the act was to take effect at the same time as the Merchant Shipping Act (17 & 18 Vict. c. 104). (Note: 1 May 1855, section 3.)

Section 4 of the act repealed 48 acts or part of acts, listed in Schedule (A.) to the act, with some safeguards and exceptions for actions done before the commencement of the act.

Section 5 of the act provided that Local Marine Boards appointed under the Mercantile Marine Act 1850 (13 & 14 Vict. c. 93) continue to act until 4 February 1857.

Section 6 of the act made consequential amendments to the Pilotage Law Amendment Act 1853 (16 & 17 Vict. c. 129).

Section 7 of the act allowed the Board of Trade to pay for the expenses of life boats out of the Mercantile Marine Fund, immediately from the passing of the act.

Section 8 of the act continued the liabilities on the Mercantile Marine Fund as the Merchant Shipping Law Amendment Act 1853 (16 & 17 Vict. c. 131).

Section 9 of the act provided that wages from seamen or apprentices received before 1 January 1852 be applied as if they had been received under the Merchant Shipping Act (17 & 18 Vict. c. 104).

Section 10 of the act provided that the Receiver General of Droits of Admiralty shall conform to directions of the Board of Trade.

Section 11 of the act empowered the Board of Trade to appoint receivers.

Section 12 of the act provided for payment of receivers.

Section 13 of the act provided that fees received by receivers, serjeants, deputies or other officers be allowed for personal use.

Section 14 of the act provided that the Ninth Part of the Merchant Shipping Act (17 & 18 Vict. c. 104) come into force and that the Merchant Shipping Act 1786 (26 Geo. 3 c. 86) and Responsibility of Shipowners Act 1813 (53 G. 3. c. 159) be repealed immediately on the passing of the act.

Section 15 of the act provided that criminal proceedings under the Seamen's Fund Winding-up Act 1851 (14 & 15 Vict. c. 102), the Pilotage Law Amendment Act 1853 (16 & 17 Vict. c. 129) and Merchant Shipping Law Amendment Act 1853 (c. 131) be carried under the same manner as the Merchant Shipping Act (17 & 18 Vict. c. 104).

Section 16 of the act provided that the penalty on masters of ships leaving seamen in the United Kingdom from Asia, Africa, the South Sea, the Pacific Ocean or any country not having a consul in the United Kingdom be a fine not exceeding 30l.

== Subsequent developments ==
The qualified terms of the repeal led to several acts being repealed by later Statute Law Revision Acts, including:

- Statute Law Revision Act 1874 (37 & 38 Vict. c. 35)

In 1876, the Customs Consolidation Act 1876 (39 & 40 Vict. c. 36) was passed, which further consolidated the customs law.

Section 4, the first proviso, section 5, section 7 from "and this" to the end of that section, section 8 from "and whereas" to the end of that section, section 9, section 10 from "and this" to the end of that section, section 12 from "and this" to the end of that section and section 14 were repealed by section 1 of, and the schedule to, the Statute Law Revision Act 1875 (38 & 39 Vict. c. 66), which came into force on 11 August 1875.

The preamble to, sections 3 and 4 of, and the schedule to, the act were repealed by section 1 of, and the schedule to, the Statute Law Revision Act 1892 (55 & 56 Vict. c. 19), which came into force on 20 June 1892.

In 1894, the Merchant Shipping Act 1894 (57 & 58 Vict. c. 60) was passed, which further consolidated merchant shipping law and repealed section 16 of the act.

Sections 6 and 8 of the act were repealed by section 1(1) of, and the first schedule to, the Statute Law Revision Act 1950 (14 Geo. 6. c. 6), which came into force on 23 May 1950.

Section 15 of the act was repealed by section 1 of, and the schedule to, the Statute Law Revision Act 1963, which came into force on 31 July 1963.

Section 7 of the act was repealed by section 314(1) of, and schedule 7 to, the Merchant Shipping Act 1995, which came into force on 1 January 1996.

== Repealed enactments ==
Section 4 of the act repealed 48 enactments, listed in the schedule to the act, to take effect at the same time as the Merchant Shipping Act 1854 (17 & 18 Vict. c. 104). (Note: 1 May 1855, section 3.) The section provided exceptions for:

1. Any Provisions contained in the Act of the Seventh Year of His late Majesty King William the Fourth, Chapter Seventy-nine, (Note: Lighthouses Act 1836 (6 & 7 Will. 4. c. 79)) as to Title, Application of Purchase Money, or borrowing Money, and having relation to the Power of purchasing Lighthouses given to the Trinity Board by the same Act:
2. Any Security duly given before this Act comes into operation.
3. Any Thing duly done before this Act comes into operation.
4. Any Liability accruing before this Act comes into operation.
5. Any Penalty, Forfeiture, or other Punishment incurred or to be incurred in respect of any Offence committed before this Act comes into operation:
6. The Institution or Prosecution of any legal Proceeding or any other Remedy for ascertaining, enforcing, or recovering any such Liability, Penalty, Forfeiture, or Punishment as aforesaid:
7. Any Appointment, Byelaw, Regulation, or Licence duly made or granted under any Enactment hereby repealed, and subsisting at the Time when this Act comes into operation and the same shall continue in force, but shall be subject to such Provisions of the Merchant Shipping Act, 1854, as are applicable respectively.

Citation	Short title	Title	Extent of repeal
8 Eliz. c. 13	Sea Marks Act 1566	An Act touching Sea Marks and Mariners.	Except Section 2.
12 Anne, Stat. 2. c. 18	Stranded Ships Act 1713	An Act for the preserving all such Ships and Goods thereof which shall happen to be forced on shore or stranded on the Coasts of this Kingdom or on any other of Her Majesty's Dominions.	So much as is not already repealed.
4 Geo. 1. c. 12	Stranded Ships, etc. Act 1717	An Act for enforcing and making perpetual an Act of the Twelfth Year of Her late Majesty, intituled "An Act for preserving all such Ships and Goods thereof which shall happen to be forced on shore or stranded upon the Coasts of this Kingdom or any other of Her Majesty's Dominions;" and for inflicting the Punishment of Death on such as shall wilfully burn or destroy Ships.	So much as is not already repealed.
7 Geo. 2. c. 15	Responsibility of Shipowners Act 1733	An Act to settle how far Owners of Ships shall be answerable for the Acts of the Masters or Mariners.	The whole act.
20 Geo. 2. c. 38	Merchant Seamen Act 1746	An Act for the Relief and Support of maimed disabled Seamen, and the Widows and Children of such as shall be killed, slain, or drowned in the Merchant Service.	So much as is not already repealed.
26 Geo. 2. c. 19	Stealing Shipwrecked Goods Act 1753	An Act for enforcing the Laws against Persons who shall steal or detain shipwrecked Goods, and for the Relief of Persons suffering Losses thereby.	So much as is not already repealed.
26 Geo. 3. c. 86	Merchant Shipping Act 1786	An Act to explain and amend an Act made in the Seventh Year of His late Majesty's Reign, intituled "An Act to settle how far Owners of Ships shall be answerable for the Acts of the Masters or Mariners;" and for giving a further Relief to the Owners of Ships.	The whole act. (Note: To be repealed immediately on the passing of the act (section 14).)
26 Geo. 3. c. 101	Erection of Lighthouses Act 1786	An Act for erecting certain Lighthouses in the Northern Parts of Great Britain.	The whole act.
28 Geo. 3. c. 25	Erection of Lighthouses Act 1788	An Act to render more effectual an Act passed in the Twenty-sixth Year of His present Majesty's Reign, intituled "An Act for erecting certain Lighthouses in the Northern Parts of Great Britain."	The whole act.
29 Geo. 3. c. 52	Erection of Lighthouses Act 1789	An Act to give further Powers to the Commissioners for erecting certain Lighthouses in the Northern Parts of Great Britain.	The whole act.
35 Geo. 3. c. 57 (Note: Local and personal.)	N/A	An Act for incorporating the Commissioners appointed for erecting certain Lighthouses in the Northern Parts of Great Britain.	The whole act.
46 Geo. 3. c. 106	Revenue (Ireland) Act 1806	An Act to provide for the better Execution of the several Acts relating to the Revenues, Matters, and Things under the Management of the Commissioners of Customs and Port Duties, and of the Commissioners of Inland Excise and Taxes in Ireland.	Sections 75 and 76.
46 Geo. 3. c. 132	Cape Rock Lighthouse (Scotland) Act 1806	An Act for erecting a Lighthouse on the Bell or Cape Rock on the Eastern Coast of Scotland, and for enabling the Commissioners of the Treasury to advance a certain Sum of Money out of the Consolidated Fund of Great Britain towards that Purpose.	The whole act.
48 Geo. 3. c. 130	Frauds by Boatmen in Cinque Ports, etc. Act 1808	An Act for preventing the various Frauds and Depredations committed on Merchants, Shipowners, and Underwriters, by Boatmen and others, within the Jurisdiction of the Cinque Ports, and also for remedying certain Defects relative to the Adjustment of Salvage under a Statute made in the Twelfth Year of the Reign of Her late Majesty Queen Anne.	The whole act.
50 Geo. 3. c. 95	Lighthouses (Ireland) Act 1810	An Act to enable the corporation for preserving and improving the Port of Dublin to erect, repair, and maintain Lighthouses round the Coast of Ireland, and to raise a Fund for defraying the Charge thereof.	The whole act.
51 Geo. 3. c. 66	Irish Lighthouses Act 1811	An Act to amend and render more effectual several Acts for promoting the Trade of the Port of Dublin, by rendering its Port and Harbour more commodious, and for erecting, repairing, and maintaining Lighthouses round the Coast of Ireland, and to raise a Fund for defraying the Charge thereof.	The whole Act, so far as relates to Lighthouses and Light Dues.
52 Geo. 3. c. 115	Port of Dublin Lighthouses Act 1812	An Act to make more effectual Provision for enabling the corporation for preserving and improving the Port of Dublin to erect, repair, and maintain Lighthouses and Light Houses round the Coasts of Ireland, and to raise a Fund for defraying the Charge thereof.	The whole act.
53 Geo. 3. c. 159	Responsibility of Shipowners Act 1813	An Act to limit the Responsibility of Shipowners in certain Cases.	The whole act. (Note: To be repealed immediately on the passing of the act (section 14).)
54 Geo. 3. c. 136	Northern Lighthouse Commissioners Act 1814	An Act for enabling the Commissioners of the Northern Lighthouses to purchase the Island and Light of May at the Entrance of the Frith of Forth, for enabling the Commissioners of the Treasury to advance a certain Sum of Money towards that Purpose, and for amending several Acts in regard to the Northern Lighthouses.	The whole act.
55 Geo. 3. c. lxvii	Isle of Man and Calf of Man Lighthouses Act 1815	An Act for enabling the Commissioners of the Northern Lighthouses to erect Lighthouses on the Isles of Man and Calf of Man.	The whole act.
59 Geo. 3. c. 12	Poor Relief Act 1819	An Act to amend the Laws for the Relief of the Poor.	Section 32.
1 & 2 Geo. 4. c. 76	Cinque Ports Act 1821	An Act to continue and amend certain Acts for preventing the various Frauds and Depredations committed on Merchants, Shipowners, and Underwriters, by Boatmen and others, within the Jurisdiction of the Cinque Ports, and also for remedying certain Defects relative to the Adjustment of Salvage under a Statute made in the Twelfth Year of the Reign of Her late Majesty Queen Anne.	The whole Act, except Sections 1, 2, 3, 4, 5, 15, 16, and 18.
4 Geo. 4. c. 88	Passenger Vessels (No. 2) Act 1823	An Act for regulating Vessels carrying Passengers between Great Britain and Ireland.	The whole act.
6 Geo. 4. c. 125	Pilotage Act 1825	An Act for the Amendment of the Law respecting Pilots and Pilotage, and also for the better Preservation of Floating Lights, Buoys, and Beacons.	The whole act.
9 Geo. 4. c. 86	Cinque Ports Pilots Act 1828	An Act to amend an Act for the better Preservation of Floating Lights, Buoys, and Beacons.	The whole act.
11 Geo. 4. c. 20	Pay of the Navy Act 1830	An Act to amend and consolidate the Laws relating to Pay of the Royal Navy.	Section 32.
4 & 5 Wm. 4. c. 52	Merchant Seaman's Widows, etc. Act 1834	An Act to amend an Act of the Twentieth Year of His late King George the Second, for the Relief and Support of sick, maimed, and disabled Seamen, and the Widows and Children of such as shall be killed, slain, or drowned in the Merchant Service, and for other Purposes.	So much as is not already repealed.
5 & 6 Wm. 4. c. 19	Merchant Seamen Act 1835	An Act to amend and consolidate the Laws relating to Merchant Seamen of the United Kingdom, and for forming and maintaining a Register of all the Men engaged in that Service.	So much as is not already repealed.
6 & 7 Wm. 4. c. 79	Lighthouses Act 1836	An Act for vesting Lighthouses, Lights, and Sea Marks on the Coasts of England in the Corporation of Trinity House of Deptford Strond; and for making Provisions respecting Lighthouses, Lights, Buoys, Beacons, and Sea Marks, and the Tolls and Duties payable in respect thereof.	The whole act. (Note: This act was repealed wholly by the Statute Law Revision Act 1874 (37 & 38 Vict. c. 35): "Repealed by 17 & 18 Vict. c. 120. s. 3. with savings; as to parts saved, spent, or superseded by 17 & 18 Vict. c. 104. Part VI., or inoperative.")
1 & 2 Vict. c. 66	Gibraltar Lighthouse, etc. Act 1838	An Act for maintaining a Lighthouse at Gibraltar, and respecting Lighthouses not within the United Kingdom.	The whole act.
3 & 4 Vict. c. 68	Pilots, etc. Act 1840	An Act to enable Her Majesty in Council to authorise Ships and Vessels belonging to Countries having Treaties of Reciprocity with the United Kingdom to be piloted, in certain Cases, without having a licensed Pilot on board; and also to regulate the Mode in which Pilot Boats shall be painted and distinguished.	The whole act.
7 & 8 Vict. c. 112	Merchant Seamen Act 1844	An Act to amend and consolidate the Laws relating to Merchant Seamen; and for keeping a Register of Seamen.	The whole act.
8 & 9 Vict. c. 86	Customs (No. 3) Act 1845	An Act for the General Regulation of the Customs.	Sections 45, 51, 83, and 140.
8 & 9 Vict. c. 87	Prevention of Smuggling Act 1845	An Act for the Prevention of Smuggling.	Section 10.
8 & 9 Vict. c. 89	Registering of British Vessels Act 1845	An Act for the registering of British Vessels.	The whole act.
8 & 9 Vict. c. 116	Merchant Seaman Act 1845	An Act for the Protection of Seamen entering on board Merchant Ships.	The whole act.
9 & 10 Vict. c. 99	Wreck and Salvage Act 1846	An Act for consolidating and amending the Laws relating to Wreck and Salvage.	The whole act.
12 & 13 Vict. c. 29	Navigation Act 1849	An Act to amend the Laws in force for the Encouragement of British Shipping and Navigation.	The whole act.
12 & 13 Vict. c. 88	Pilotage Act 1849	An Act to amend the Laws relating to Pilotage.	The whole act.
13 & 14 Vict. c. 93	Mercantile Marine Act 1850	An Act for improving the Condition of Masters, Mates, and Seamen, and maintaining Discipline in the Merchant Service.	The whole act.
13 & 14 Vict. c. 95	Customs Act 1850	An Act to amend the Laws relating to the Customs.	Section 14.
14 & 15 Vict. c. 35	Naval Apprentices (Ireland) Act 1851	An Act to extend the Benefits of certain Provisions of the General Merchant Seamen's Act relating to Apprentices bound to the Sea Service to Apprentices bound to the Sea Service by Boards of Guardians for Unions in Ireland, and to enable such Guardians to place out Boys in the Naval Service.	The whole Act, except Section 10.
14 & 15 Vict. c. 79	Steam Navigation Act 1851	An Act to consolidate and amend the Laws relating to the Regulation of Steam Navigation, and to the Boats and Lights to be carried by sea-going Vessels.	The whole act.
14 & 15 Vict. c. 96	Mercantile Marine Act Amendment Act 1851	An Act to amend the Mercantile Marine Act, 1850.	The whole act.
14 & 15 Vict. c. 102	Seamen's Fund Winding-up Act 1851	An Act to amend the Acts relating to the Merchant Seamen's Fund, and to provide for winding up the said Fund, and for the better Management thereof in the meantime.	Sections 29, 30, 31, 32, 33, 34, 35, 36, 37, 38, and 61.
16 & 17 Vict. c. 129	Pilotage Law Amendment Act 1853	An Act further to amend the Law relating to Pilotage.	The whole Act, except Sections 3, 4, 5, 8, 10, 11, 12, 13, and so much of Section 9 as relates to the Recovery of Pilotage Rates by Cinque Ports Pilots licensed after the Act came into operation.
16 & 17 Vict. c. 131	Merchant Shipping Law Amendment Act 1853	An Act to amend various Laws relating to Merchant Shipping.	The whole Act, except Sections 12, 13, 24, 28, and 29.
17 & 18 Vict. c. 5	Coasting Trade Act 1854	An Act to admit Foreign Ships to the Coasting Trade.	Section 4.

== See also ==
- Merchant Shipping Act
- Statute Law Revision Act
