= Customs Consolidation Act 1876 =

Act of the Parliament of the United Kingdom

Customs Consolidation Act 1876 (Note: Section 290.)
- Act of Parliament
- Parliament of the United Kingdom
- Long title: An Act to consolidate the Customs Laws.
- Citation: 39 & 40 Vict. c. 36
- Introduced by: William Henry Smith MP (Commons)
- Territorial extent: United Kingdom; Guernsey (Note: Section 289.); Jersey (Note: Section 289.)

Dates
- Royal assent: 24 July 1876
- Commencement: 24 July 1876 (Note: Section 290.)
Other legislation
Amends	See § Repealed enactments
Repeals/revokes	See § Repealed enactments
Amended by	Customs Amendment Act 1857; Crown Suits, &c. Act 1865; Customs Amendment Act 1867; House Tax Act 1871; Regulation of the Forces Act 1881; Statute Law Revision Act 1883; Customs Consolidation Act 1876, Amendment Act 1887; Customs Consolidation Act 1876 Amendment Act 1890; Public Authorities Protection Act 1893; Perjury Act 1911; Copyright Act 1911; Forgery Act 1913; Indictments Act 1915; Territorial Army and Militia Act 1921; False Oaths (Scotland) Act 1933; Local Government Act 1933; Public Health Act 1936; Administration of Justice (Miscellaneous Provisions) Act 1938; Customs and Excise Act 1952; Statute Law (Repeals) Act 1969; Hallmarking Act 1973; Forgery and Counterfeiting Act 1981; Statute Law (Repeals) Act 1986; Statute Law (Repeals) Act 1993; Statute Law (Repeals) Act 2008
Relates to	Customs Law Repeal Act 1825; Customs Act 1826; Excise Management Act 1827; Customs (Repeal) Act 1833; Customs (Repeal) Act 1845; Customs Consolidation Act 1853; Merchant Shipping Repeal Act 1854; Supplemental Customs Consolidation Act 1855

Status: Amended

Text of statute as originally enacted

Revised text of statute as amended

Text of the Customs Consolidation Act 1876 as in force today (including any amendments) within the United Kingdom, from legislation.gov.uk.

The Customs Consolidation Act 1876 (39 & 40 Vict. c. 36) is an act of the Parliament of the United Kingdom that further consolidated the various enactments relating to customs in the United Kingdom.

== Background ==
In the United Kingdom, acts of Parliament remain in force until expressly repealed. Blackstone's Commentaries on the Laws of England, published in the late 18th-century, raised questions about the system and structure of the common law and the poor drafting and disorder of the existing statute book.

In 1806, the Commission on Public Records passed a resolution requesting the production of a report on the best mode of reducing the volume of the statute book. From 1810 to 1825, The Statutes of the Realm was published, providing for the first time the authoritative collection of acts.

By the early 19th century, British customs law, relating to trade, navigation, the import and export of goods, and the collection of customs revenue, had become increasingly intricate and difficult to navigate due to the large number of acts passed that had accumulated over many years. This complexity posed challenges for both commerce and law enforcement. The preamble of the Act acknowledged that the existing system had become an impediment to trade and the "Ends of Justice".

In 1810, the Lords of the Treasury asked Nicholas Jickling to produce a Digest of the Laws of the Customs, which was published in 1815, numbering 1,375 pages from the earliest period to 53 Geo. 3. This Digest was continuously published to bring the state of the law up to date to the end of every session. In 1814, the Commission of Public Records published their 14th Report, recommending consolidation of the statute law.

In 1822, the Navigation and Commerce Act 1822 (3 Geo. 4. c. 43) was passed to encourage shipping and navigation. The Repeal of Acts Concerning Importation Act 1822 (c. 41) and the Repeal of Acts Concerning Importation (No. 2) Act 1822 ( c. 42) were passed at the same time to repealed related inconsistent or obsolete enactments.

In 1823, the Customs and Excise Act 1823 (4 Geo. 4. c. 23) was passed, which consolidated the several Boards of Customs, and also, the several Boards of Excise across the United Kingdom.

By a letter dated 9 August 1823, Secretary to the Treasury, John Charles Herries MP, asked J. D. Hume, Controller of the Port of London, to "undertake the preparation of a general law, or set of laws, for the consolidation of the customs of the United Kingdom".

The original plan for the consolidation was outlined in a letter dated November 18, 1824, from Mr. Herries, Secretary of the Treasury, to the Customs Commissioners, proposing: The plan proposed a two-pronged approach:

1. Specific repeal: Identifying and listing specific acts and parts of acts to be repealed, ensuring their removal from the statute book.
2. General description: Implementing a general repeal clause to address any potential omissions and provide legal clarity.

Despite the intention to create a new legal code that would supersede all previous customs laws, with a declaration that no law predating the new code would remain in force, the general repeal clause was withdrawn, the operation of the repeal of the enumerated acts was postponed for six months and full implementation of the new consolidated code was deferred to a future date.

On 15 April 1825, the Committee on Customs and Excise Consolidation Acts reported and resolved that it was "expedient to repeal the several Laws relating to the Customs now in force; and to consolidate the various enactments therein contained."

In 1826, eleven customs acts were passed to consolidate to all practical purposes the whole statute law of the customs by repealing the numerous existing customs statutes and replace them with new, more clearly written laws. The acts simplified tariff schedules, to make it easier for traders to understand duties, revised penalties for customs offences to ensure fair and consistent enforcement and introduced standardised procedures for customs declarations, to reduce administrative burdens and increase efficiency at ports.

- Customs, etc. Act 1825 (9 Geo. 4. c. 106)
- Customs, etc. (No. 2) Act 1825 (9 Geo. 4. c. 107)
- Customs, etc. (No. 3) Act 1825 (6 Geo. 4. c. 108)
- Customs, etc. (No. 4) Act 1825 (6 Geo. 4. c. 109)
- Customs, etc. (No. 5) Act 1825 (6 Geo. 4. c. 110)
- Customs, etc. (No. 6) Act 1825 (6 Geo. 4. c. 111)
- Customs, etc. (No. 7) Act 1825 (6 Geo. 4. c. 112)
- Customs, etc. (No. 8) Act 1825 (6 Geo. 4. c. 113)
- Customs, etc. (No. 9) Act 1825 (6 Geo. 4. c. 114)
- Customs, etc. (No. 10) Act 1825 (6 Geo. 4. c. 115)
- Passenger Vessels Act 1825 (6 Geo. 4 c. 116)

In 1825, the Customs Law Repeal Act 1825 (6 Geo. 4. c. 105) was passed to repeal 443 related enactments. In 1826, the Customs Act 1826 (7 Geo. 4. c. 48) was passed, which reversed the repeal of several enactments.

In 1827, the Excise Management Act 1827 (7 & 8 Geo. 4. c. 53) was passed, which consolidated enactments relating to the collection and management of customs.

In 1833, eleven customs acts were passed to further amend and consolidate the customs law:

- Customs, etc. Act 1833 (3 & 4 Will. 4. c. 51)
- Customs, etc. (No. 2) Act 1833 (3 & 4 Will. 4. c. 52)
- Customs, etc. (No. 3) Act 1833 (3 & 4 Will. 4. c. 53)
- Customs, etc. (No. 4) Act 1833 (3 & 4 Will. 4. c. 54)
- Customs, etc. (No. 5) Act 1833 (3 & 4 Will. 4. c. 55)
- Customs, etc. (No. 6) Act 1833 (3 & 4 Will. 4. c. 56)
- Customs, etc. (No. 7) Act 1833 (3 & 4 Will. 4. c. 57)
- Customs, etc. (No. 8) Act 1833 (3 & 4 Will. 4. c. 58)
- Customs, etc. (No. 9) Act 1833 (3 & 4 Will. 4. c. 59)
- Customs, etc. (No. 10) Act 1833 (3 & 4 Will. 4. c. 60)
- Customs, etc. (No. 11) Act 1833 (3 & 4 Will. 4. c. 61)

In 1833, the Customs (Repeal) Act 1833 (3 & 4 Will. 4. c. 50) was passed to repeal 24 related enactments.

In 1845, 10 customs acts were passed to further amend and consolidate the customs law:

- Commissioners of Customs Act 1845 (8 & 9 Vict. c. 85)
- Customs (No. 3) Act 1845 (8 & 9 Vict. c. 86)
- Prevention of Smuggling Act 1845 (8 & 9 Vict. c. 87)
- Shipping, etc. Act 1845 (8 & 9 Vict. c. 89)
- Registering of British Vessels Act 1845 (8 & 9 Vict. c. 90)
- Duties of Customs Act 1845 (8 & 9 Vict. c. 91)
- Warehousing of Goods Act 1845 (8 & 9 Vict. c. 92)
- Customs (No. 4) Act 1845 (8 & 9 Vict. c. 93)
- Trade of British Possessions Act 1845 (8 & 9 Vict. c. 94)
- Isle of Man Trade Act 1845 (8 & 9 Vict. c. 95)

In 1845, the Customs (Repeal) Act 1845 (8 & 9 Vict. c. 84) was passed to repeal 26 related enactments.

In 1853, the Customs Consolidation Act 1853 (16 & 17 Vict. c. 107) was passed to consolidate the customs law.

In 1854, the Merchant Shipping Act 1854 (17 & 18 Vict. c. 104) and Merchant Shipping Repeal Act 1854 (c. 120) were passed to consolidate the law relating to merchant shipping and repeal 48 related statutes.

In 1855, the Supplemental Customs Consolidation Act 1855 (17 & 18 Vict. c. 96) was passed to further consolidate the customs law.

On 1876, the House of Commons resolved to bring in a Bill to consolidate the customs laws.

== Passage ==
Leave to bring in the Customs Laws Consolidation Bill was granted to Henry Cecil Raikes MP, the Financial Secretary to the Treasury, William Henry Smith MP and the chancellor of the exchequer, Stafford Northcote MP on 18 May 1876. The bill had its first reading in the House of Commons on 18 May 1876, presented by the financial secretary to the treasury, William Henry Smith MP. The bill had its second reading in the House of Commons on 15 June 1856 and was committed to a committee of the whole house, which met on 3 July 1876 and reported on 6 July 1876, with amendments. The amended bill had its third reading in the House of Commons on 30 July 1855 and passed, without amendments.

The bill had its first reading in the House of Lords on 10 July 1876. The bill had its second reading in the House of Lords on 11 July 1876 and was committed to a committee of the whole house, which met and reported on 13 July 1876, without amendments. The bill had its third reading in the House of Lords on 17 July 1876 and passed, without amendments.

The bill was granted royal assent on 24 July 1876.

== Subsequent developments ==
The act was amended by several acts in the following sessions, including:

- Customs Amendment Act 1857 (20 & 21 Vict. c. 62)
- Crown Suits, &c. Act 1865 (28 & 29 Vict. c. 104)
- Customs Amendment Act 1867 (30 & 31 Vict. c. 82)
- House Tax Act 1871 (34 & 35 Vict. c. 103)

In section 42 of the act, the words from "Clocks and watches" to "United Kingdom ", were repealed by section 23 of, and part I of schedule 7 to, the Hallmarking Act 1973, which came into force on 1 January 1975.

Section 43 of the act was repealed by section 1(1) of, and part IV of schedule 1 to, the Statute Law (Repeals) Act 1986, which came into force on 2 May 1986.

== Repealed enactments ==
Section 288 of the act repealed 28 enactments, listed in schedule (A.) to the act, to take effect upon the passing of the act. (Note: Section 47.) The section included exceptions for:

1. Any repeals of former acts contained within the acts being repealed, which remain in effect.
2. Arrears of duties or drawbacks that had become due and payable prior to this act.
3. Any penalty or forfeiture which had been incurred under the previous acts.

Section 288 of the act also ensured that all orders in council, bonds taken, licenses granted etc. made under the authority of the repealed acts would remain valid, commissions, deputations, bonds etc. would remain in force and ports, bonding places, havens, creeks etc. would continue.

Citation	Short title	Title	Extent of repeal
8 & 9 Vict. c. 85	Commissioners of Customs Act 1845	An Act for the Management of the Customs.	Sections 2 and 3.
16 & 17 Vict. c. 107	Customs Consolidation Act 1853	An Act to amend and consolidate the laws relating to the Customs of the United Kingdom and of the Isle of Man, and certain Laws relating to Trade and Navigation and the British Possessions.	The whole act, except sections 114, 115, and 116, relating to cards; sections 165, 166, 181, 182, 183, 185, 187, and 188, so far as they relate to those of Her Majesty's possessions abroad in which other provisions have not been substituted by Local Act or Ordinance with the sanction of Her Majesty; sections 324 to 327 both inclusive, and 329 to 331 both inclusive, relating to reciprocity in commerce, and sections 332, 333, and 335 to 341 both inclusive, and also 343, 344, and 345, relating to the acquisition and disposal of lands.
18 & 19 Vict. c. 96	Supplemental Customs Consolidation Act 1855	The Supplemental Customs Consolidation Act.	The whole act.
18 & 19 Vict. c. 97	Customs Tariff Act 1855	The Customs Tariff Act, 1855.	The whole act.
19 & 20 Vict. c. 75	Customs Act 1856	The Customs Laws and Duties Amendment Act, 1856.	The whole act, except section 6.
20 Vict. c. 15	Customs Duties Amendment Act 1857	The Customs Duties Amendment Act, 1857.	The whole act. (Note: This act was already repealed by the Statute Law Revision Act 1875 (38 & 39 Vict. c. 66).)
20 & 21 Vict. c. 61	Customs and Excise Duties Act 1857	The Customs and Excise Duties Act, 1857.	The whole act. (Note: This act was already repealed by the Statute Law Revision Act 1875 (38 & 39 Vict. c. 66).)
20 & 21 Vict. c. 62	Customs Amendment Act 1857	The Customs Amendment Act, 1857.	The whole act.
21 & 22 Vict. c. 12 (Note: The text of the act cites this as "21 Vict. c. 12".)	Customs Duties Act 1858	The Customs Duties Act, 1858.	The whole act. (Note: This act was already repealed by the Statute Law Revision Act 1875 (38 & 39 Vict. c. 66).)
22 & 23 Vict. c. 37	Customs Amendment Act 1859	The Customs Amendment Act, 1859.	The whole act.
23 & 24 Vict. c. 22 (Note: The text of the act cites this as "23 Vict. c. 22".)	Customs Tariff Amendment Act 1860	The Customs Tariff Amendment Act, 1860.	The whole act.
23 & 24 Vict. c. 36	Customs Inland Bonding Act 1860	The Customs Inland Bonding Act, 1856.	The whole act.
24 & 25 Vict. c. 20 (Note: The text of the act cites this as "24 Vict. c. 20".)	Customs and Inland Revenue Act 1861	The Customs and Inland Revenue Act, 1861.	So much as relates to Customs.
25 & 26 Vict. c. 22 (Note: The text of the act cites this as "25 Vict. c. 22".)	Revenue Act 1862	The Customs and Inland Revenue Act, 1862.	So much as relates to Customs.
26 & 27 Vict. c. 22 (Note: The text of the act cites this as "26 Vict. c. 22".)	Customs and Inland Revenue Act 1863	The Customs and Inland Revenue Act, 1863.	So much as relates to Customs.
27 & 28 Vict. c. 18 (Note: The text of the act cites this as "27 Vict. c. 18".)	Revenue (No. 1) Act 1864	The Customs and Inland Revenue Act, 1864.	So much as relates to Customs.
28 & 29 Vict. c. 30 (Note: The text of the act cites this as "28 Vict. c. 30".)	Revenue Act 1865	The Customs and Inland Revenue Act, 1865.	So much as relates to Customs.
28 & 29 Vict. c. 95	Sugar Duties and Drawbacks Act 1865	The Sugar Duties and Drawbacks Act, 1865.	The whole act. (Note: This act was already repealed by the Statute Law Revision Act 1875 (38 & 39 Vict. c. 66).)
30 & 31 Vict. c. 10 (Note: The text of the act cites this as "30 Vict. c. 10".)	Sugar Duties Act 1867	The Sugar Duties Act, 1867.	The whole act. (Note: This act was already repealed by the Statute Law Revision Act 1875 (38 & 39 Vict. c. 66).)
30 & 31 Vict. c. 23 (Note: The text of the act cites this as "30 Vict. c. 23".)	Customs and Inland Revenue Act 1867	The Customs and Inland Revenue Act, 1867.	So much as relates to Customs.
30 & 31 Vict. c. 82	Customs Amendment Act 1867	The Customs Amendment Act, 1867.	The whole act.
31 & 32 Vict. c. 28 (Note: The text of the act cites this as "31 Vict. c. 28".)	Revenue Act 1868	The Customs and Income Tax Act, 1868.	So much as relates to Customs.
32 & 33 Vict. c. 14	Revenue Act 1869	The Customs and Inland Revenue Duties Act, 1869.	So much as relates to Customs.
33 & 34 Vict. c. 12 (Note: The text of this act cites this as "33 Vict. c. 12".)	Customs (Isle of Man) Act 1870	The Sugar Duties (Isle of Man) Act, 1870.	The whole act.
33 & 34 Vict. c. 32	Customs and Inland Revenue Act 1870	The Customs and Inland Revenue Act, 1870.	So much as relates to Customs.
34 & 35 Vict. c. 21 (Note: The text of this act cites this as "34 Vict. c. 21".)	Customs and Income Tax Act 1871	The Customs and Income Tax Act, 1871.	So much as relates to Customs.
36 & 37 Vict. c. 29 (Note: The text of this act cites this as "36 Vict. c. 29".)	Customs Sugar Duties (Isle of Man) Act 1873	The Customs Sugar Duties (Isle of Man) Act, 1873.	The whole act.
37 & 38 Vict. c. 16	Customs and Inland Revenue Act 1874	The Customs and Inland Revenue Act, 1874.	So much as relates to Customs.

== Subsequent developments ==
Sections 268–272 of the act were repealed by section 2 of, and the schedule to, the Public Authorities Protection Act 1893 (56 & 57 Vict. c. 61), which came into force on 1 January 1894.

Section 275 of the act, so far as unrepealed, was repealed by section 1 of, and part VII of the schedule to, the Statute Law (Repeals) Act 1969, which came into force on 1 January 1970.

Section 285 of the act from “and the Life Assurance Companies Act 1870” onwards was repealed by section 1(1) of, and group 2 of part I of schedule 1 to, the Statute Law (Repeals) Act 1993, which came into force on 5 November 1993.

== See also ==
- Statute Law Revision Act
