= Supplemental Customs Consolidation Act 1855 =

Act of the Parliament of the United Kingdom

Supplemental Customs Consolidation Act 1855 (Note: Section 47.)
- Act of Parliament
- Parliament of the United Kingdom
- Long title: An Act to consolidate certain Acts, and otherwise amend the Laws of the Customs, and an Act to regulate the Office of the Receipt of Her Majesty's Exchequer at Westminster.
- Citation: 18 & 19 Vict. c. 96
- Introduced by: James Wilson MP (Commons)
- Territorial extent: United Kingdom

Dates
- Royal assent: 14 August 1855
- Commencement: 14 August 1855 (Note: Section 47.)
- Repealed: 24 July 1876
Other legislation
Amends	See § Repealed enactments
Repeals/revokes	See § Repealed enactments
Amended by	Customs Amendment Act 1857; Crown Suits, &c. Act 1865; Exchequer and Audit Departments Act 1866; Customs Amendment Act 1867; House Tax Act 1871; Statute Law Revision Act 1875
Repealed by	Customs Consolidation Act 1876
Relates to	Customs Law Repeal Act 1825; Customs Act 1826; Excise Management Act 1827; Customs (Repeal) Act 1833; Customs (Repeal) Act 1845; Customs Consolidation Act 1853; Merchant Shipping Repeal Act 1854; Customs Consolidation Act 1876

Status: Repealed

History of passage through Parliament

Records of Parliamentary debate relating to the statute from Hansard

Text of statute as originally enacted

The Supplemental Customs Consolidation Act 1855 (17 & 18 Vict. c. 96) was an act of the Parliament of the United Kingdom that further consolidated the various statutes relating to customs in the United Kingdom.

== Background ==
In the United Kingdom, acts of Parliament remain in force until expressly repealed. Blackstone's Commentaries on the Laws of England, published in the late 18th-century, raised questions about the system and structure of the common law and the poor drafting and disorder of the existing statute book.

In 1806, the Commission on Public Records passed a resolution requesting the production of a report on the best mode of reducing the volume of the statute book. From 1810 to 1825, The Statutes of the Realm was published, providing for the first time the authoritative collection of acts.

By the early 19th century, British customs law, relating to trade, navigation, the import and export of goods, and the collection of customs revenue, had become increasingly intricate and difficult to navigate due to the large number of acts passed that had accumulated over many years. This complexity posed challenges for both commerce and law enforcement. The preamble of the Act acknowledged that the existing system had become an impediment to trade and the "Ends of Justice".

In 1810, the Lords of the Treasury asked Nicholas Jickling to produce a Digest of the Laws of the Customs, which was published in 1815, numbering 1,375 pages from the earliest period to 53 Geo. 3. This Digest was continuously published to bring the state of the law up to date to the end of every session. In 1814, the Commission of Public Records published their 14th Report, recommending consolidation of the statute law.

In 1822, the Navigation and Commerce Act 1822 (3 Geo. 4. c. 43) was passed to encourage shipping and navigation. The Repeal of Acts Concerning Importation Act 1822 (c. 41) and the Repeal of Acts Concerning Importation (No. 2) Act 1822 ( c. 42) were passed at the same time to repealed related inconsistent or obsolete enactments.

In 1823, the Customs and Excise Act 1823 (4 Geo. 4. c. 23) was passed, which consolidated the several Boards of Customs, and also, the several Boards of Excise across the United Kingdom.

By a letter dated 9 August 1823, Secretary to the Treasury, John Charles Herries MP, asked J. D. Hume, Controller of the Port of London, to "undertake the preparation of a general law, or set of laws, for the consolidation of the customs of the United Kingdom".

The original plan for the consolidation was outlined in a letter dated 18 November 1824, from Mr. Herries, Secretary of the Treasury, to the Customs Commissioners, proposing: The plan proposed a two-pronged approach:

1. Specific repeal: Identifying and listing specific acts and parts of acts to be repealed, ensuring their removal from the statute book.
2. General description: Implementing a general repeal clause to address any potential omissions and provide legal clarity.

Despite the intention to create a new legal code that would supersede all previous customs laws, with a declaration that no law predating the new code would remain in force, the general repeal clause was withdrawn, the operation of the repeal of the enumerated acts was postponed for six months and full implementation of the new consolidated code was deferred to a future date.

On 15 April 1825, the Committee on Customs and Excise Consolidation Acts reported and resolved that it was "expedient to repeal the several Laws relating to the Customs now in force; and to consolidate the various enactments therein contained."

In 1825, eleven customs acts were passed to consolidate to all practical purposes the whole statute law of the customs by repealing the numerous existing customs statutes and replace them with new, more clearly written laws. The acts simplified tariff schedules, to make it easier for traders to understand duties, revised penalties for customs offences to ensure fair and consistent enforcement and introduced standardised procedures for customs declarations, to reduce administrative burdens and increase efficiency at ports.

- Customs, etc. Act 1825 (9 Geo. 4. c. 106)
- Customs, etc. (No. 2) Act 1825 (9 Geo. 4. c. 107)
- Customs, etc. (No. 3) Act 1825 (6 Geo. 4. c. 108)
- Customs, etc. (No. 4) Act 1825 (6 Geo. 4. c. 109)
- Customs, etc. (No. 5) Act 1825 (6 Geo. 4. c. 110)
- Customs, etc. (No. 6) Act 1825 (6 Geo. 4. c. 111)
- Customs, etc. (No. 7) Act 1825 (6 Geo. 4. c. 112)
- Customs, etc. (No. 8) Act 1825 (6 Geo. 4. c. 113)
- Customs, etc. (No. 9) Act 1825 (6 Geo. 4. c. 114)
- Customs, etc. (No. 10) Act 1825 (6 Geo. 4. c. 115)
- Passenger Vessels Act 1825 (6 Geo. 4 c. 116)

In 1825, the Customs Law Repeal Act 1825 (6 Geo. 4. c. 105) was passed to repeal 443 related enactments. In 1826, the Customs Act 1826 (7 Geo. 4. c. 48) was passed, which reversed the repeal of several enactments.

In 1827, the Excise Management Act 1827 (7 & 8 Geo. 4. c. 53) was passed, which consolidated enactments relating to the collection and management of customs.

In 1833, eleven customs acts were passed to further amend and consolidate the customs law:

- Customs, etc. Act 1833 (3 & 4 Will. 4. c. 51)
- Customs, etc. (No. 2) Act 1833 (3 & 4 Will. 4. c. 52)
- Customs, etc. (No. 3) Act 1833 (3 & 4 Will. 4. c. 53)
- Customs, etc. (No. 4) Act 1833 (3 & 4 Will. 4. c. 54)
- Customs, etc. (No. 5) Act 1833 (3 & 4 Will. 4. c. 55)
- Customs, etc. (No. 6) Act 1833 (3 & 4 Will. 4. c. 56)
- Customs, etc. (No. 7) Act 1833 (3 & 4 Will. 4. c. 57)
- Customs, etc. (No. 8) Act 1833 (3 & 4 Will. 4. c. 58)
- Customs, etc. (No. 9) Act 1833 (3 & 4 Will. 4. c. 59)
- Customs, etc. (No. 10) Act 1833 (3 & 4 Will. 4. c. 60)
- Customs, etc. (No. 11) Act 1833 (3 & 4 Will. 4. c. 61)

In 1833, the Customs (Repeal) Act 1833 (3 & 4 Will. 4. c. 50) was passed to repeal 24 related enactments.

In 1845, 10 customs acts were passed to further amend and consolidate the customs law:

- Commissioners of Customs Act 1845 (8 & 9 Vict. c. 85)
- Customs (No. 3) Act 1845 (8 & 9 Vict. c. 86)
- Prevention of Smuggling Act 1845 (8 & 9 Vict. c. 87)
- Shipping, etc. Act 1845 (8 & 9 Vict. c. 89)
- Registering of British Vessels Act 1845 (8 & 9 Vict. c. 90)
- Duties of Customs Act 1845 (8 & 9 Vict. c. 91)
- Warehousing of Goods Act 1845 (8 & 9 Vict. c. 92)
- Customs (No. 4) Act 1845 (8 & 9 Vict. c. 93)
- Trade of British Possessions Act 1845 (8 & 9 Vict. c. 94)
- Isle of Man Trade Act 1845 (8 & 9 Vict. c. 95)

In 1845, the Customs (Repeal) Act 1845 (8 & 9 Vict. c. 84) was passed to repeal 26 related enactments.

In 1853, Customs Consolidation Act 1853 (16 & 17 Vict. c. 107) was passed to consolidate the customs law.

In 1854, the Merchant Shipping Act 1854 (17 & 18 Vict. c. 104) and Merchant Shipping Repeal Act 1854 (c. 120) were passed to consolidate the law relating to merchant shipping and repeal 48 related statutes.

On 19 July 1855, the Committee on the Customs Acts passed a resolution that it was expedient to consolidate the various Acts now in force imposing Duties of Customs on goods, wares and merchandize imported into the United Kingdom, so far as they relate to such Duties and to consolidate certain Acts relating to the Customs, and otherwise to amend the Laws of the Customs.

== Passage ==
The Customs Laws Consolidation Bill had its first reading in the House of Commons on 19 July 1855, presented by the financial secretary to the treasury, James Wilson MP. The bill had its second reading in the House of Commons on 24 July 1855 and was committed to a committee of the whole house, which met on 25 July 1855 and 28 July 1855 and reported on 29 July 1855, with amendments. The amended bill had its third reading in the House of Commons on 31 July 1855 and passed, without amendments.

The bill had its first reading in the House of Lords on 2 August 1855. The bill had its second reading in the House of Lords on 3 August 1855 and was committed to a committee of the whole house, which met and reported on 6 August 1855, with amendments. The bill had its third reading in the House of Lords on 9 August and passed, without amendments.

The amended bill was considered and agreed to by the House of Commons on 10 August 1855.

The bill was granted royal assent on 14 August 1855.

== Subsequent developments ==
The act was amended by several acts in the following sessions, including:

- Customs Amendment Act 1857 (20 & 21 Vict. c. 62)
- Crown Suits, &c. Act 1865 (28 & 29 Vict. c. 104)
- Customs Amendment Act 1867 (30 & 31 Vict. c. 82)
- House Tax Act 1871 (34 & 35 Vict. c. 103)
- Statute Law Revision Act 1875 (38 & 39 Vict. c. 66)

The act was repealed by section 288 of, and schedule (A.) to, the Customs Consolidation Act 1876 (39 & 40 Vict. c. 36), which came into force on 24 July 1876.

== Repealed enactments ==
Section 44 of the act repealed 3 enactments, listed in Schedule (A.) to the act, to take effect upon the passing of the act. (Note: Section 47.) The section included exceptions for:

1. Any repeals of former acts contained within the acts being repealed, which remain in effect.
2. Arrears of duties or drawbacks that had become due and payable prior to this act.
3. Any penalty or forfeiture which had been incurred under the previous acts.

The section also ensured that all orders in council, bonds taken, licenses granted etc. made under the authority of the repealed acts would remain valid.

Citation	Short Title	Title	Extent of repeal
16 & 17 Vict. c. 107	Customs Consolidation Act 1853	Customs Consolidation Act, 1853	Sections 119, 192, 193, 198, 210, 212, 213, 214, 236, 240, 346, 348. So much of the Table of Prohibitions and Restrictions Inwards on Goods prohibited to be imported except subject to the Restrictions on Importation therein contained, as relates to Tobacco and Snuff under the several Denominations of Tobacco, Cigars, Cigarillos, Cigarettos, and Snuff, being Part of Section 44. The following Words, viz., "With the Addition of the Value of such Goods, if any, as shall have been previously chargeable with Duty at Value of British Goods," being Part of the Proviso contained in Section 125; and so much of Section 142 as relates to the Delivery of a Duplicate Bill of Lading on the Shipment of Goods, and within Fourteen Days after final Clearance of the Ship, a List of such Goods, with the Quantities and Values thereof, as thereby required.
16 & 17 Vict. c. 5 (Note: The text of the act cites this as "17 Vict. c. 5")	Coasting Trade Act 1854	An Act to admit Foreign Ships to the Coasting Trade.	The whole act.
17 & 18 Vict. c. 122	Customs Act 1854	An Act for the further Alteration and Amendment of the Laws and Duties of Customs.	The whole act.

== See also ==
- Statute Law Revision Act
