= Customs Consolidation Act 1853 =

Act of Parliament of the United Kingdom

Customs Consolidation Act 1853 (Note: Section 360.)
- Act of Parliament
- Parliament of the United Kingdom
- Long title: An Act to repeal the several Laws relating to the Customs.
- Citation: 16 & 17 Vict. c. 107
- Introduced by: James Wilson MP (Commons)
- Territorial extent: United Kingdom

Dates
- Royal assent: 20 August 1853
- Commencement: 20 August 1853 (Note: Section 360.)
- Repealed: 2 May 1986
Other legislation
Amends	See § Repealed enactments
Repeals/revokes	See § Repealed enactments
Amended by	Coasting Trade Act 1854; Customs (No. 2) Act 1854; Customs Act 1854; Supplemental Customs Consolidation Act 1855; Customs Amendment Act 1857; Customs Duties Consolidation Act 1860; Merchant Shipping Act Amendment Act 1862; Customs Amendment Act 1867; Merchant Shipping (Colonial) Act 1869; House Tax Act 1871; Slave Trade Act 1873; Forgery Act 1913; Customs and Excise Act 1952; Statute Law Revision Act 1963; Statute Law (Repeals) Act 1969; Statute Law (Repeals) Act 1971
Repealed by	Statute Law (Repeals) Act 1986
Relates to	Customs Law Repeal Act 1825; Customs (Repeal) Act 1833; Customs (Repeal) Act 1845; Customs Tariff Act 1853; Merchant Shipping Repeal Act 1854; Supplemental Customs Consolidation Act 1855; Customs Consolidation Act 1876

Status: Repealed

History of passage through Parliament

Records of Parliamentary debate relating to the statute from Hansard

Text of statute as originally enacted

The Customs Consolidation Act 1853 (16 & 17 Vict. c. 107) was an act of the Parliament of the United Kingdom that consolidated the various enactments relating to customs in the United Kingdom.

== Background ==
In the United Kingdom, acts of Parliament remain in force until expressly repealed. Blackstone's Commentaries on the Laws of England, published in the late 18th-century, raised questions about the system and structure of the common law and the poor drafting and disorder of the existing statute book.

In 1806, the Commission on Public Records passed a resolution requesting the production of a report on the best mode of reducing the volume of the statute book. From 1810 to 1825, The Statutes of the Realm was published, providing for the first time the authoritative collection of acts.

By the early 19th century, British customs law, relating to trade, navigation, the import and export of goods, and the collection of customs revenue, had become increasingly intricate and difficult to navigate due to the large number of acts passed that had accumulated over many years. This complexity posed challenges for both commerce and law enforcement. The preamble of the Act acknowledged that the existing system had become an impediment to trade and the "Ends of Justice".

In 1810, the Lords of the Treasury asked Nicholas Jickling to produce a Digest of the Laws of the Customs, which was published in 1815, numbering 1,375 pages from the earliest period to 53 Geo. 3. This Digest was continuously published to bring the state of the law up to date to the end of every session. In 1814, the Commission of Public Records published their 14th Report, recommending consolidation of the statute law.

In 1822, the Navigation and Commerce Act 1822 (3 Geo. 4. c. 43) was passed to encourage shipping and navigation. The Repeal of Acts Concerning Importation Act 1822 (c. 41) and the Repeal of Acts Concerning Importation (No. 2) Act 1822 (c. 42) were passed at the same time to repealed related inconsistent or obsolete enactments.

In 1823, the Customs and Excise Act 1823 (4 Geo. 4. c. 23) was passed, which consolidated the several Boards of Customs, and also, the several Boards of Excise across the United Kingdom.

By a letter dated 9 August 1823, Secretary to the Treasury, John Charles Herries MP, asked J. D. Hume, Controller of the Port of London, to "undertake the preparation of a general law, or set of laws, for the consolidation of the customs of the United Kingdom".

The original plan for the consolidation was outlined in a letter dated November 18, 1824, from Mr. Herries, Secretary of the Treasury, to the Customs Commissioners, proposing: The plan proposed a two-pronged approach:

1. Specific repeal: Identifying and listing specific acts and parts of acts to be repealed, ensuring their removal from the statute book.
2. General description: Implementing a general repeal clause to address any potential omissions and provide legal clarity.

Despite the intention to create a new legal code that would supersede all previous customs laws, with a declaration that no law predating the new code would remain in force, the general repeal clause was withdrawn, the operation of the repeal of the enumerated acts was postponed for six months and full implementation of the new consolidated code was deferred to a future date.

On 15 April 1825, the Committee on Customs and Excise Consolidation Acts reported and resolved that it was "expedient to repeal the several Laws relating to the Customs now in force; and to consolidate the various enactments therein contained."

In 1825, eleven customs acts were passed to consolidate to all practical purposes the whole statute law of the customs by repealing the numerous existing customs statutes and replace them with new, more clearly written laws. The acts simplified tariff schedules, to make it easier for traders to understand duties, revised penalties for customs offences to ensure fair and consistent enforcement and introduced standardised procedures for customs declarations, to reduce administrative burdens and increase efficiency at ports.

- Customs, etc. Act 1825 (9 Geo. 4. c. 106)
- Customs, etc. (No. 2) Act 1825 (9 Geo. 4. c. 107)
- Customs, etc. (No. 3) Act 1825 (6 Geo. 4. c. 108)
- Customs, etc. (No. 4) Act 1825 (6 Geo. 4. c. 109)
- Customs, etc. (No. 5) Act 1825 (6 Geo. 4. c. 110)
- Customs, etc. (No. 6) Act 1825 (6 Geo. 4. c. 111)
- Customs, etc. (No. 7) Act 1825 (6 Geo. 4. c. 112)
- Customs, etc. (No. 8) Act 1825 (6 Geo. 4. c. 113)
- Customs, etc. (No. 9) Act 1825 (6 Geo. 4. c. 114)
- Customs, etc. (No. 10) Act 1825 (6 Geo. 4. c. 115)
- Passenger Vessels Act 1825 (6 Geo. 4 c. 116)

In 1825, the Customs Law Repeal Act 1825 (6 Geo. 4. c. 105) was passed to repeal 443 related enactments. In 1826, the Customs Act 1826 (7 Geo. 4. c. 48) was passed, which reversed the repeal of several enactments.

In 1827, the Excise Management Act 1827 (7 & 8 Geo. 4. c. 53) was passed, which consolidated enactments relating to the collection and management of customs.

In 1833, eleven customs acts were passed to further amend and consolidate the customs law:

- Customs, etc. Act 1833 (3 & 4 Will. 4. c. 51)
- Customs, etc. (No. 2) Act 1833 (3 & 4 Will. 4. c. 52)
- Customs, etc. (No. 3) Act 1833 (3 & 4 Will. 4. c. 53)
- Customs, etc. (No. 4) Act 1833 (3 & 4 Will. 4. c. 54)
- Customs, etc. (No. 5) Act 1833 (3 & 4 Will. 4. c. 55)
- Customs, etc. (No. 6) Act 1833 (3 & 4 Will. 4. c. 56)
- Customs, etc. (No. 7) Act 1833 (3 & 4 Will. 4. c. 57)
- Customs, etc. (No. 8) Act 1833 (3 & 4 Will. 4. c. 58)
- Customs, etc. (No. 9) Act 1833 (3 & 4 Will. 4. c. 59)
- Customs, etc. (No. 10) Act 1833 (3 & 4 Will. 4. c. 60)
- Customs, etc. (No. 11) Act 1833 (3 & 4 Will. 4. c. 61)

In 1833, the Customs (Repeal) Act 1833 (3 & 4 Will. 4. c. 50) was passed to repeal 24 related enactments.

In 1845, 10 customs acts were passed to further amend and consolidate the customs law:

- Commissioners of Customs Act 1845 (8 & 9 Vict. c. 85)
- Customs (No. 3) Act 1845 (8 & 9 Vict. c. 86)
- Prevention of Smuggling Act 1845 (8 & 9 Vict. c. 87)
- Shipping, etc. Act 1845 (8 & 9 Vict. c. 89)
- Registering of British Vessels Act 1845 (8 & 9 Vict. c. 90)
- Duties of Customs Act 1845 (8 & 9 Vict. c. 91)
- Warehousing of Goods Act 1845 (8 & 9 Vict. c. 92)
- Customs (No. 4) Act 1845 (8 & 9 Vict. c. 93)
- Trade of British Possessions Act 1845 (8 & 9 Vict. c. 94)
- Isle of Man Trade Act 1845 (8 & 9 Vict. c. 95)

In 1845, the Customs (Repeal) Act 1845 (8 & 9 Vict. c. 84) was passed to repeal 26 related enactments.

== Passage ==
The Customs Acts Consolidation Bill had its first reading in the House of Commons on 30 July 1853, presented by the financial secretary to the treasury, James Wilson MP. The bill had its second reading in the House of Commons on 1 August 1853 and was committed to a committee of the whole house, which met on 2 August 1853 and 8 August 1853 and reported on 9 August 1853, with amendments. The amended bill had its third reading in the House of Commons on 10 August 1853 and passed, without amendments.

The bill had its first reading in the House of Lords on 11 August 1853. The bill had its second reading in the House of Lords on 15 August 1853 and was committed to a committee of the whole house, which met and reported on 15 August 1853, with amendments. The bill had its third reading in the House of Lords on 19 August 1853, and passed, without amendments.

The amended bill was considered and agreed to by the House of Commons on 19 August 1853.

The bill was granted royal assent on 20 August 1853.

== Subsequent developments ==
The act was amended by several acts in the following sessions, including:

- Coasting Trade Act 1854 (17 & 18 Vict. c. 5)
- Customs (No. 2) Act 1854 (17 & 18 Vict. c. 29)
- Customs Act 1854 (17 & 18 Vict. c. 122)
- Supplemental Customs Consolidation Act 1855 (18 & 19 Vict. c. 96)
- Customs Amendment Act 1857 (20 & 21 Vict. c. 62)
- Customs Duties Consolidation Act 1860 (23 & 24 Vict. c. 110)
- Merchant Shipping Act Amendment Act 1862 (25 & 26 Vict. c. 63)
- Customs Amendment Act 1867 (30 & 31 Vict. c. 82)
- Merchant Shipping (Colonial) Act 1869 (32 & 33 Vict. c. 11)
- House Tax Act 1871 (34 & 35 Vict. c. 103)

In 1876, the Customs Consolidation Act 1876 (39 & 40 Vict. c. 36) was passed, which further consolidated the customs law.

In section 327 of the act , the words " or within the limits of the East India Company's charter (excepting the possessions of the said Company) " were repealed by section 1 of, and the schedule to, the Statute Law Revision Act 1963, which came into force on 31 July 1963.

Sections 332,333, 335–341 and 343–345 of the act were repealed by section 1 of, and part VII of the schedule to, the Statute Law (Repeals) Act 1969, which came into force on 1 January 1970.

Section 327 of the act act was repealed by section 1 of, and the part IX of the schedule to, the Statute Law (Repeals) Act 1971, which came into force on 27 July 1971.

The whole act were repealed by section 1(1) of, and part XI of schedule 1 to, the Statute Law (Repeals) Act 1986, which came into force on 2 May 1986.

== Provisions ==
=== Repealed enactments ===
Section 358 of the act repealed 17 enactments, listed in schedule (A.) to the act. Section 358 of the act included exceptions for:

1. Any repeals of former acts contained within the acts being repealed, which remain in effect.
2. Arrears of duties or drawbacks that had become due and payable prior to this act.
3. Any penalty or forfeiture which had been incurred under the previous acts.

Citation	Short title	Title	Extent of repeal
6 Geo. 4. c. 41	Stamps Act 1825	An Act to repeal the Stamp Duties payable in Great Britain and Ireland upon the Transfer of Property in Ships and Vessels, and upon Bonds and Debentures required to be given in relation to the Duties, Drawbacks, and Bounties of Customs or Excise, and to grant other Duties of Stamps on such Bonds and Debentures.	Section 4, so far as relates to Her Majesty's Customs.
8 & 9 Vict. c. 85	Commissioners of Customs Act 1845	An Act for the Management of the Customs.	The whole act, except Sections 2 and 3.
8 & 9 Vict. c. 86	Customs (No. 3) Act 1845	An Act for the general Regulation of the Customs.	The whole act, except Sections 45, 139, and 140, and Section 53, so far as relates to Scotland.
8 & 9 Vict. c. 87	Prevention of Smuggling Act 1845	An Act for the Prevention of Smuggling.	The whole act, except Sections 10 and 124.
8 & 9 Vict. c. 90	Duties of Customs Act 1845	An Act for granting Duties of Customs.	The whole act.
8 & 9 Vict. c. 91	Warehousing of Goods Act 1845	An Act for the warehousing of Goods.	The whole act, except Section 51.
8 & 9 Vict. c. 92	Customs (No. 4) Act 1845	An Act to grant Bounties and Allowances of Customs.	The whole act.
8 & 9 Vict. c. 93	Trade of British Possessions Act 1845	An Act to regulate the Trade of British Possessions abroad.	The whole act.
8 & 9 Vict. c. 94	Trade of British Possessions Act 1845	An Act for the regulating the Trade of the Isle of Man.	The whole act.
9 & 10 Vict. c. 23 (Note: This is duplicated in the act as "10 Vict. c. 23".)	Customs Act 1846	An Act to alter certain Duties of Customs.	The whole act.
9 & 10 Vict. c. 102	Customs (No. 4) Act 1846	An Act to amend the Laws relating to the Customs.	The whole act.
11 & 12 Vict. c. 60	Duties on Spirits Act 1848	An Act to alter the Duties payable upon the Importation of Spirits or Strong Waters.	The whole act.
11 & 12 Vict. c. 97	Sugar Duties Act 1848	An Act to repeal the Duties of Customs upon the Importation of Sugar, and to impose new Duties in lieu thereof.	The whole act.
12 & 13 Vict. c. 29	Navigation Act 1849	An Act to amend the Laws in force for the Encouragement of British Shipping and Navigation.	The whole act, except Sections 7, 8, 9, 17, 18, 19, and 20.
12 & 13 Vict. c. 90	Customs Act 1849	An Act to amend the Laws relating to the Customs.	The whole act, except Section 43.
13 & 14 Vict. c. 95	Customs Act 1850	An Act to amend the Laws relating to the Customs.	The whole act, except Section 14.
14 & 15 Vict. c. 62	Customs Act 1851	An Act to alter certain Duties of Customs, and to enable the Treasury to regulate the Mode of keeping the Account between the Receiver General of Customs and the Bank of England.	The whole act.

== See also ==
- Statute Law Revision Act
