= Excise Management Act 1827 =

Act of the Parliament of the United Kingdom

Excise Management Act 1827 (Note: The citation of this act by this short title was authorised by section 1 of, and the first schedule to, the Short Titles Act 1896. Due to the repeal of those provisions it is now authorised by section 19(2) of the Interpretation Act 1978.)
- Act of Parliament
- Parliament of the United Kingdom
- Long title: An Act to consolidate and amend the Laws relating to the Collection and Management of the Revenue of Excise throughout Great Britain and Ireland.
- Citation: 7 & 8 Geo. 4. c. 53
- Introduced by: Sir George Hill MP (Commons)
- Territorial extent: United Kingdom

Dates
- Royal assent: 2 July 1827
- Commencement: 6 January 1828 (Note: Section 129.)
- Repealed: 17 April 1957
Other legislation
Amends	See § Repealed enactments
Repeals/revokes	See § Repealed enactments
Amended by	Inland Revenue Regulation Act 1890; Statute Law Revision Act 1890; Statute Law Revision Act 1891; Perjury Act 1911; False Oaths (Scotland) Act 1933; Finance Act 1934; Finance Act 1944; Statute Law Revision Act 1950
Repealed by	Customs and Excise Act 1952; House of Commons Disqualification Act 1957
Relates to	Customs Law Repeal Act 1825; Customs Act 1826; Customs (Repeal) Act 1833; Customs (Repeal) Act 1845; Customs Consolidation Act 1853; Merchant Shipping Repeal Act 1854; Supplemental Customs Consolidation Act 1855; Customs Consolidation Act 1876

Status: Repealed

Text of statute as originally enacted

The Excise Management Act 1827 (7 & 8 Geo. 4. c. 53) was an act of the Parliament of the United Kingdom that consolidated enactments relating to the collection and management of customs in the United Kingdom.

== Background ==
In the United Kingdom, acts of Parliament remain in force until expressly repealed. Blackstone's Commentaries on the Laws of England, published in the late 18th-century, raised questions about the system and structure of the common law and the poor drafting and disorder of the existing statute book.

In 1806, the Commission on Public Records passed a resolution requesting the production of a report on the best mode of reducing the volume of the statute book. From 1810 to 1825, The Statutes of the Realm was published, providing for the first time the authoritative collection of acts.

By the early 19th century, British customs law, relating to trade, navigation, the import and export of goods, and the collection of customs revenue, had become increasingly intricate and difficult to navigate due to the large number of acts passed that had accumulated over many years. This complexity posed challenges for both commerce and law enforcement. The preamble of the Act acknowledged that the existing system had become an impediment to trade and the "Ends of Justice".

In 1810, the Lords of the Treasury asked Nicholas Jickling to produce a Digest of the Laws of the Customs, which was published in 1815, numbering 1,375 pages from the earliest period to 53 Geo. 3. This Digest was continuously published to bring the state of the law up to date to the end of every session. In 1814, the Commission of Public Records published their 14th Report, recommending consolidation of the statute law.

In 1822, the Navigation and Commerce Act 1822 (3 Geo. 4. c. 43) was passed to encourage shipping and navigation. The Repeal of Acts Concerning Importation Act 1822 (3 Geo. 4. c. 41) and the Repeal of Acts Concerning Importation (No. 2) Act 1822 (3 Geo. 4. c. 42) were passed at the same time to repealed related inconsistent or obsolete enactments.

In 1823, the Customs and Excise Act 1823 (4 Geo. 4. c. 23) was passed, which consolidate the several Boards of Customs, and also, the several Boards of Excise across the United Kingdom.

By a letter dated 9 August 1823, Secretary to the Treasury, John Charles Herries MP, asked J. D. Hume, Controller of the Port of London, to "undertake the preparation of a general law, or set of laws, for the consolidation of the customs of the United Kingdom".

The original plan for the consolidation was outlined in a letter dated November 18, 1824, from Mr. Herries, Secretary of the Treasury, to the Customs Commissioners, proposing: The plan proposed a two-pronged approach:

1. Specific repeal: Identifying and listing specific acts and parts of acts to be repealed, ensuring their removal from the statute book.
2. General description: Implementing a general repeal clause to address any potential omissions and provide legal clarity.

Despite the intention to create a new legal code that would supersede all previous customs laws, with a declaration that no law predating the new code would remain in force, the general repeal clause was withdrawn, the operation of the repeal of the enumerated acts was postponed for six months and full implementation of the new consolidated code was deferred to a future date.

On 15 April 1825, the Committee on Customs and Excise Consolidation Acts reported and resolved that it was "expedient to repeal the several Laws relating to the Customs now in force; and to consolidate the various enactments therein contained."

In 1825, eleven customs acts were passed to consolidate to all practical purposes the whole statute law of the customs by repealing the numerous existing customs statutes and replace them with new, more clearly written laws. The acts simplified tariff schedules, to make it easier for traders to understand duties, revised penalties for customs offences to ensure fair and consistent enforcement and introduced standardised procedures for customs declarations, to reduce administrative burdens and increase efficiency at ports.

- Customs, etc. Act 1825 (9 Geo. 4. c. 106)
- Customs, etc. (No. 2) Act 1825 (9 Geo. 4. c. 107)
- Customs, etc. (No. 3) Act 1825 (6 Geo. 4. c. 108)
- Customs, etc. (No. 4) Act 1825 (6 Geo. 4. c. 109)
- Customs, etc. (No. 5) Act 1825 (6 Geo. 4. c. 110)
- Customs, etc. (No. 6) Act 1825 (6 Geo. 4. c. 111)
- Customs, etc. (No. 7) Act 1825 (6 Geo. 4. c. 112)
- Customs, etc. (No. 8) Act 1825 (6 Geo. 4. c. 113)
- Customs, etc. (No. 9) Act 1825 (6 Geo. 4. c. 114)
- Customs, etc. (No. 10) Act 1825 (6 Geo. 4. c. 115)
- Passenger Vessels Act 1825 (6 Geo. 4 c. 116)

In 1825, the Customs Law Repeal Act 1825 (6 Geo. 4. c. 105) was passed to repeal 443 related enactments. In 1826, the Customs Act 1826 (7 Geo. 4. c. 48) was passed, which reversed the repeal of several statutes.

== Passage ==
Leave to bring in the Excise Laws Bill to the House of Commons was granted to Sir Alexander Grant MP, the Chancellor of the Exchequer, George Canning MP and the secretary to the treasury, John Charles Herries MP on 30 May 1827, following a report by the Committee on Excise Duties Acts. The bill had its first reading in the House of Commons on 8 June 1827, presented by the Sir George Hill MP. The bill had its second reading in the House of Commons on 11 June 1827 and was committed to a committee of the whole house, which met and reported on 12 June 1827, with amendments. The amended bill had its third reading in the House of Commons on 23 June 1827 and passed, without amendments.

The bill, now named the Excise Duties Collection Bill, had its first reading in the House of Lords on 23 June 1827. The bill had its second reading in the House of Lords on 25 June 1827 and was committed to a committee of the whole house, which met and reported on 26 June 1827, without amendments. The bill had its third reading in the House of Lords on 27 June 1827 and passed, without amendments.

The bill was granted royal assent on 2 July 1827.

== Provisions ==
Section 127 of the act repealed all laws, powers authorities, rules, regulations, restrictions, restrictions, exceptions, provisions, clauses, matters and things inconsistent with the act, with an exception for things done under those acts.

== Criticism ==
The terms of the repeal in section 127 of the act were criticised by Thomas Chisholm Anstey, a member of the Board for the Revision of the Statute Law for being too broad by including all enactments inconsistent with the act.

== Subsequent developments ==
In 1833, eleven customs acts were passed to further amend and consolidate the customs law:

- Customs, etc. Act 1833 (3 & 4 Will. 4. c. 51)
- Customs, etc. (No. 2) Act 1833 (3 & 4 Will. 4. c. 52)
- Customs, etc. (No. 3) Act 1833 (3 & 4 Will. 4. c. 53)
- Customs, etc. (No. 4) Act 1833 (3 & 4 Will. 4. c. 54)
- Customs, etc. (No. 5) Act 1833 (3 & 4 Will. 4. c. 55)
- Customs, etc. (No. 6) Act 1833 (3 & 4 Will. 4. c. 56)
- Customs, etc. (No. 7) Act 1833 (3 & 4 Will. 4. c. 57)
- Customs, etc. (No. 8) Act 1833 (3 & 4 Will. 4. c. 58)
- Customs, etc. (No. 9) Act 1833 (3 & 4 Will. 4. c. 59)
- Customs, etc. (No. 10) Act 1833 (3 & 4 Will. 4. c. 60)
- Customs, etc. (No. 11) Act 1833 (3 & 4 Will. 4. c. 61)

In 1845, 10 customs acts were passed to further amend and consolidate the customs law:

- Commissioners of Customs Act 1845 (8 & 9 Vict. c. 85)
- Customs (No. 3) Act 1845 (8 & 9 Vict. c. 86)
- Prevention of Smuggling Act 1845 (8 & 9 Vict. c. 87)
- Shipping, etc. Act 1845 (8 & 9 Vict. c. 89)
- Registering of British Vessels Act 1845 (8 & 9 Vict. c. 90)
- Duties of Customs Act 1845 (8 & 9 Vict. c. 91)
- Warehousing of Goods Act 1845 (8 & 9 Vict. c. 92)
- Customs (No. 4) Act 1845 (8 & 9 Vict. c. 93)
- Trade of British Possessions Act 1845 (8 & 9 Vict. c. 94)
- Isle of Man Trade Act 1845 (8 & 9 Vict. c. 95)

In 1845, the Customs (Repeal) Act 1845 (8 & 9 Vict. c. 84) was passed to repeal 26 related enactments.

In 1853, Customs Consolidation Act 1853 (16 & 17 Vict. c. 107) was passed to consolidate the customs law.

Sections 38 and 107 of the act were repealed by section 1(1) of, and the first schedule to, the Statute Law Revision Act 1950 (14 Geo. 6. c. 6), which came into force on 23 May 1950.

The whole act, except section 8, was repealed by section 320(1) of, and part I of the twelfth schedule to, the Customs and Excise Act 1952 (15 & 16 Geo. 6 & 1 Eliz. 2. c. 44), which came into force on 1 January 1953.

The whole act was repealed by section 14(1) of, and part I of schedule 4 to, the House of Commons Disqualification Act 1957 (5 & 6 Eliz. 2. c. 20), which came into force on 17 April 1957.
