= Customs (Repeal) Act 1833 =

Act of the Parliament of the United Kingdom

Customs (Repeal) Act 1833 (Note: The citation of this act by this short title was authorised by section 1 of, and the first schedule to, the Short Titles Act 1896. Due to the repeal of those provisions it is now authorised by section 19(2) of the Interpretation Act 1978.)
- Act of Parliament
- Parliament of the United Kingdom
- Long title: An Act to repeal the several Laws relating to the Customs.
- Citation: 3 & 4 Will. 4. c. 50
- Introduced by: Charles Poulett Thomson MP (Commons)
- Territorial extent: United Kingdom

Dates
- Royal assent: 28 August 1833
- Commencement: 1 September 1833 (Note: Section 1.)
- Repealed: 29 July 1960
Other legislation
Amends	See § Repealed enactments
Repeals/revokes	See § Repealed enactments
Amended by	Statute Law Revision Act 1874; Statute Law Revision (No. 2) Act 1888; Customs and Excise Act 1952
Repealed by	Statute Law Revision Act 1960
Relates to	Customs Law Repeal Act 1825; Customs Act 1826; Excise Management Act 1827; Customs, etc. Act 1833; Customs, etc. (No. 2) Act 1833; Customs, etc. (No. 3) Act 1833; Customs, etc. (No. 4) Act 1833; Customs, etc. (No. 5) Act 1833; Customs, etc. (No. 6) Act 1833; Customs, etc. (No. 7) Act 1833; Customs, etc. (No. 8) Act 1833; Customs, etc. (No. 9) Act 1833; Customs, etc. (No. 10) Act 1833; Customs, etc. (No. 11) Act 1833; Customs (Repeal) Act 1844; Customs (Repeal) Act 1845; Customs Consolidation Act 1853; Merchant Shipping Act 1854; Supplemental Customs Consolidation Act 1855

Status: Repealed

History of passage through Parliament

Records of Parliamentary debate relating to the statute from Hansard

Text of statute as originally enacted

The Customs (Repeal) Act 1833 (3 & 4 Will. 4. c. 50) was an act of the Parliament of the United Kingdom that repealed various statutes relating to customs in the United Kingdom.

== Background ==
In the United Kingdom, acts of Parliament remain in force until expressly repealed. Blackstone's Commentaries on the Laws of England, published in the late 18th century, raised questions about the system and structure of the common law and the poor drafting and disorder of the existing statute book.

In 1806 the Commission on Public Records passed a resolution requesting the production of a report on the best mode of reducing the volume of the statute book. From 1810 to 1825, The Statutes of the Realm was published, providing for the first time the authoritative collection of acts.

By the early 19th century, British customs law, relating to trade, navigation, the import and export of goods, and the collection of customs revenue, had become increasingly intricate and difficult to navigate due to the large number of acts passed that had accumulated over many years. This complexity posed challenges for both commerce and law enforcement. The preamble of the Act acknowledged that the existing system had become an impediment to trade and the "Ends of Justice".

In 1810, the Lords of the Treasury asked Nicholas Jickling to produce a Digest of the Laws of the Customs, which was published in 1815, numbering 1,375 pages from the earliest period to 53 Geo. 3. This Digest was continuously published to bring the state of the law up to date to the end of every session. In 1814, the Commission of Public Records published their 14th Report, recommending consolidation of the statute law.

In 1822, the Navigation and Commerce Act 1822 (3 Geo. 4. c. 43) was passed to encourage shipping and navigation. The Repeal of Acts Concerning Importation Act 1822 (3 Geo. 4. c. 41) and the Repeal of Acts Concerning Importation (No. 2) Act 1822 (3 Geo. 4. c. 42) were passed at the same time to repealed related inconsistent or obsolete enactments.

In 1823, the Customs and Excise Act 1823 (4 Geo. 4. c. 23) was passed, which consolidate the several Boards of Customs, and also, the several Boards of Excise across the United Kingdom.

By a letter dated 9 August 1823, Secretary to the Treasury, John Charles Herries MP, asked J. D. Hume, Controller of the Port of London, to "undertake the preparation of a general law, or set of laws, for the consolidation of the customs of the United Kingdom".

The original plan for the consolidation was outlined in a letter dated 18 November 1824, from Mr. Herries, Secretary of the Treasury, to the Customs Commissioners, proposing: The plan proposed a two-pronged approach:

1. Specific repeal: Identifying and listing specific acts and parts of acts to be repealed, ensuring their removal from the statute book.
2. General description: Implementing a general repeal clause to address any potential omissions and provide legal clarity.

Despite the intention to create a new legal code that would supersede all previous customs laws, with a declaration that no law predating the new code would remain in force, the general repeal clause was withdrawn, the operation of the repeal of the enumerated acts was postponed for six months and full implementation of the new consolidated code was deferred to a future date.

On 15 April 1825, the Committee on Customs and Excise Consolidation Acts reported and resolved that it was "expedient to repeal the several Laws relating to the Customs now in force; and to consolidate the various enactments therein contained."

In 1825, eleven customs acts were passed to consolidate to all practical purposes the whole statute law of the customs by repealing the numerous existing customs statutes and replace them with new, more clearly written laws. The acts simplified tariff schedules, to make it easier for traders to understand duties, revised penalties for customs offences to ensure fair and consistent enforcement and introduced standardised procedures for customs declarations, to reduce administrative burdens and increase efficiency at ports.

- Customs, etc. Act 1825 (6 Geo. 4. c. 106)
- Customs, etc. (No. 2) Act 1825 (6 Geo. 4. c. 107)
- Customs, etc. (No. 3) Act 1825 (6 Geo. 4. c. 108)
- Customs, etc. (No. 4) Act 1825 (6 Geo. 4. c. 109)
- Customs, etc. (No. 5) Act 1825 (6 Geo. 4. c. 110)
- Customs, etc. (No. 6) Act 1825 (6 Geo. 4. c. 111)
- Customs, etc. (No. 7) Act 1825 (6 Geo. 4. c. 112)
- Customs, etc. (No. 8) Act 1825 (6 Geo. 4. c. 113)
- Customs, etc. (No. 9) Act 1825 (6 Geo. 4. c. 114)
- Customs, etc. (No. 10) Act 1825 (6 Geo. 4. c. 115)
- Passenger Vessels Act 1825 (6 Geo. 4 c. 116)

In 1825, the Customs Law Repeal Act 1825 (6 Geo. 4. c. 105) was passed to repeal 443 related enactments. In 1826, the Customs Act 1826 (7 Geo. 4. c. 48) was passed, which reversed the repeal of several enactments.

In 1827, the Excise Management Act 1827 (7 & 8 Geo. 4. c. 53) was passed, which consolidated enactments relating to the collection and management of customs.

In 1833, eleven customs bills were proposed to further amend and consolidate the customs law.

== Passage ==
On 30 March 1833, the Committee on Customs Acts resolved to bring in a bill or bills to consolidate and amend the acts in force relating to the Revenue of Customs.

Leave to bring in the Customs Acts Repeal Bill was granted to the Vice-President of the Board of Trade, Charles Poulett Thomson MP, and the chancellor of the exchequer, John Spencer, 3rd Earl Spencer MP, on 6 August 1833 and the bill had ts first reading in the House of Commons on 6 August 1833, presented by Charles Poulett Thomson MP. The bill had its second reading in the House of Commons on 7 August 1833 and was committed to a Committee of the Whole House, which met on 8 August 1833 and reported on 9 August 1833, with amendments. The amended bill had its third reading in the House of Commons on 16 August 1833 and passed, without amendments.

The Customs Laws Repeal Bill had its first reading in the House of Lords on 16 August 1833. The bill had its second reading in the House of Lords on 17 August 1833 and was committed to a Committee of the Whole House, which met and reported on 19 August 1833, without amendments. The bill had its third reading in the House of Lords on 20 August 1833 and passed, with amendments.

The amended bill was considered and agreed to by the House of Commons on 22 August 1833.

The bill was granted royal assent on 28 August 1833.

== Subsequent developments ==
In 1833, eleven customs acts were passed to further amend and consolidate the customs law:

- Customs, etc. Act 1833 (3 & 4 Will. 4. c. 51)
- Customs, etc. (No. 2) Act 1833 (3 & 4 Will. 4. c. 52)
- Customs, etc. (No. 3) Act 1833 (3 & 4 Will. 4. c. 53)
- Customs, etc. (No. 4) Act 1833 (3 & 4 Will. 4. c. 54)
- Customs, etc. (No. 5) Act 1833 (3 & 4 Will. 4. c. 55)
- Customs, etc. (No. 6) Act 1833 (3 & 4 Will. 4. c. 56)
- Customs, etc. (No. 7) Act 1833 (3 & 4 Will. 4. c. 57)
- Customs, etc. (No. 8) Act 1833 (3 & 4 Will. 4. c. 58)
- Customs, etc. (No. 9) Act 1833 (3 & 4 Will. 4. c. 59)
- Customs, etc. (No. 10) Act 1833 (3 & 4 Will. 4. c. 60)
- Customs, etc. (No. 11) Act 1833 (3 & 4 Will. 4. c. 61)

Most of the act was repealed by the Statute Law Revision Act 1874 (37 & 38 Vict. c. 96):

Sections One and Two. Section Three from "and also an Act passed in the Fifty-first" to "the unity with His Majesty"; from "and also an Act passed in the Fourth Year of the reign of His late Majesty King George the Fourth, intituled An Act for regulating" to "made for amending the said last-mentioned Act"; from "and also an Act passed in the forty-third" to "shall extend to Ireland"; the words "and also all Acts whereby any Drawback of Duty is granted in respect of Materials used in building of Churches and Chapels"; from "and also so much of an Act" to "Islands of North America"; from "and also an Act passed in the Ninth Year of the Reign of His late Majesty King George the Fourth, intituled An Act to amend" to "Sale after Importation"; and from "and also an Act passed in the Second" to "such Compensation". Sections Four to Six. Repealed as to all Her Majesty's Dominions.

Part of section 3 was repealed by the Statute Law Revision (No. 2) Act 1888 (51 & 52 Vict. c. 57):

Section three, from "and another Act passed in the fifteenth" to next following "third," and from "and also an Act made in the Parliament of Ireland" to "coal trade thereof."

The whole act was repealed by section 1(1) of, and the schedule to, the Statute Law Revision Act 1960 (8 & 9 Eliz. 2. c. 56), which came into force on 29 July 1960.

== Repealed enactments ==
Section 2 of the act repealed 24 enactments, listed in that section, to take effect on 1 September 1833. The section included exceptions for:

1. Any repeals of former acts contained within the acts being repealed, which remain in effect.
2. Arrears of duties or drawbacks that had become due and payable prior to this act.
3. Any penalty or forfeiture which had been incurred under the previous acts.

Citation	Short title	Title	Extent of repeal
6 G. 4. c. 106	Customs, etc. Act 1825	An Act passed in the Sixth Year of the Reign of His late Majesty King George the Fourth, intituled An Act for the Management of the Customs	The whole act.
6 G. 4. c. 107	Customs, etc. (No. 2) Act 1825	An Act passed in the Sixth Year of the Reign of His late Majesty King George the Fourth, intituled An Act for the general Regulation of the Customs.	The whole act.
6 G. 4. c. 108	Customs, etc. (No. 3) Act 1825	An Act passed in the Sixth Year of the Reign of His late Majesty King George the Fourth, intituled An Act for the Prevention of Smuggling.	The whole act.
6 G. 4. c. 109	Customs, etc. (No. 4) Act 1825	An Act passed in the Sixth Year of the Reign of His late Majesty King George the Fourth, intituled An Act for the Encouragement of British Shipping and Navigation.	The whole act.
6 G. 4. c. 110	Customs, etc. (No. 5) Act 1825	An Act passed in the Sixth Year of the Reign of His late Majesty King George the Fourth, intituled An Act for the registering of British Vessels.	The whole act.
6 G. 4. c. 111	Customs, etc. (No. 6) Act 1825	An Act passed in the Sixth Year of the Reign of His late Majesty King George the Fourth, intituled An Act to grant Duties of Customs.	The whole act.
6 G. 4. c. 112	Customs, etc. (No. 7) Act 1825	An Act passed in the Sixth Year of the Reign of His late Majesty King George the Fourth, intituled An Act for the warehousing of Goods.	The whole act.
6 G. 4. c. 113	Customs, etc. (No. 8) Act 1825	An Act passed in the Sixth Year of the Reign of His late Majesty King George the Fourth, intituled An Act to grant certain Bounties and Allowances of Customs.	The whole act.
6 G. 4. c. 114	Customs, etc. (No. 9) Act 1825	An Act passed in the Sixth Year of the Reign of His late Majesty King George the Fourth, intituled An Act to regulate the Trade of the British Possessions Abroad.	The whole act.
6 G. 4. c. 115	Customs, etc. (No. 10) Act 1825	An Act passed in the Sixth Year of the Reign of His late Majesty King George the Fourth, intituled An Act for regulating the Trade of the Isle of Man.	The whole act.
7 G. 4. c. 48	Customs Act 1826	an Act passed in the Seventh Year of the Reign of His late Majesty King George the Fourth, intituled An Act to alter and amend the several Laws relating to the Customs.	Except so much thereof as relates to the Distillation of Spirits in the Isle of Man
7 & 8 G. 4. c. 56	Customs Act 1827	An Act passed in the Seventh and Eighth Year of the Reign of His late Majesty King George the Fourth, intituled An Act to amend the Laws relating to the Customs.	The whole act.
9 G. 4. c. 76	Customs Act 1828	An Act passed in the Ninth Year of the Reign of His late Majesty King George the Fourth, intituled An Act to amend the Laws relating to the Customs.	Except so much thereof as relates to the Importation of Spirits into the Isle of Man.
10 G. 4. c. 23	Silk Duties Act 1829	An Act passed in the Tenth Year of the Reign of His late Majesty King George the Fourth, intituled An Act to impose Duties on the Importation of Silk and Silk Goods, and to allow Drawbacks on the Exportation thereof.	The whole act.
10 G. 4. c. 43	Customs Act 1829	An Act passed in the Tenth Year of the Reign of His late Majesty King George the Fourth, intituled An Act to amend the Laws relating to the Customs.	The whole act.
11 Geo. 4 & 1 W. 4. c. 48 (Note: Cited as 1 W. 4. c. 48 in the act.)	Duties on Spirits Act 1830	An Act passed in the First Year of the Reign of His present Majesty King William the Fourth, intituled An Act to impose an additional Duty of Customs on Spirits the Produce of the British Possessions in America.	The whole act.
1 W. 4. c. 24	Trade with British Possession Act 1831	An Act passed in the First Year of the Reign of His present Majesty King William the Fourth, intituled An Act to amend an Act of the Sixth Year of His late Majesty, to regulate the Trade of the British Possessions Abroad.	The whole act.
1 & 2 W. 4. c. 4	Excise Declarations Act 1831	An Act passed in the First and Second Year of the Reign of His present Majesty King William the Fourth, intituled An Act to abolish certain Oaths and Affirmations taken and made in the Customs and Excise Departments of His Majesty's Revenue, and to substitute Declarations in lieu thereof.	As relates to the Department of Customs.
1 & 2 W. 4. c. 16	Coal, etc., Duties Act 1831	An Act passed in the First and Second Year of the Reign of His present Majesty King William the Fourth, intituled An Act to discontinue or alter the Duties of Customs upon Coals, Slates, Cotton, Wool, Barilla, and Wax.	The whole act.
1 & 2 W. 4. c. 30	Duties on Wine Act 1831	An Act passed in the First and Second Year of the Reign of His present Majesty King William the Fourth, intituled An Act to equalize the Duties on Wine.	The whole act.
1 & 2 W. 4. c. 40	Customs Act 1831	An Act passed in the First and Second Year of the Reign of His present Majesty King William the Fourth, intituled An Act to repeal so much of an Act for the Management of the Customs as authorizes certain Fees to be taken by Officers of the Customs to make further Regulations in lieu thereof.	The whole act.
2 & 3 W. 4. c. 84	Customs Act 1832	An Act passed in the Second and Third Year of the Reign of His present Majesty King William the Fourth, intituled An Act to amend the Laws relating to the Customs.	The whole act.

Section 3 of the act repealed all acts relating to revenue of customs, navigation or smuggling, except for those listed in that section.

Citation	Short Title	Title	Comments
18 Geo. 3. c. 12	Taxation of Colonies Act 1778	An Act passed in the Eighteenth Year of the Reign of His late Majesty King George the Third, intituled An Act for removing all Doubts and Apprehensions concerning Taxation by the Parliament of Great Britain in any of the Colonies, Provinces, and Plantations in North America and the West Indies; and for repealing so much of An Act made in the Seventh Year of the Reign of His late Majesty as imposes a Duty on Tea imported from Great Britain into any Colony or Plantation in America.	And "o much of any Act or Acts, or the Parts of any Act or Acts, now in force, which was or were passed prior to the last mentioned Act, and by which any Duties in any of the British Possessions in America were granted and still continue payable to the Crown, as relates to the Collection and Appropriation of such Duties, except as herein-after excepted".
31 Geo. 3. c. 31	Clergy Endowments (Canada) Act 1791	An Act passed in the Thirty-first Year of the Reign of His late Majesty King George the Third, intituled An Act to repeal certain Parts of an Act passed in the Fourteenth Year of His Majesty's Reign, intituled An Act for making more effectual Provision for the Government of the province of Quebec in North America, and to make further Provisions for the Government of the said Province.	The whole act.
51 Geo. 3. c. 47	Commercial Treaty with Portugal Act 1811	An Act passed in the Fifty-first Year of the Reign of His late Majesty King George the Third, intituled An Act for carrying into effect the Provisions of a Treaty of Amity, Commerce, and Navigation concluded between His Majesty and His Royal Highness the Prince Regent of Portugal.	The whole act.
59 Geo. 3. c. 54	Treaty with United States, etc. Act 1819	An Act passed in the Fifty-ninth Year of the Reign of His late Majesty King George the Third, intituled An Act to carry into effect a Convention of Commerce concluded between His Majesty and the United States of America, and a Treaty with the Prince Regent of Portugal.	The whole act.
59 Geo. 3. c. 69	Foreign Enlistment Act 1819	An Act passed in the Fifty-ninth Year of the Reign of His late Majesty King George the Third, intituled An Act to prevent the enlisting or Engagement of His Majesty's Subjects to serve in Foreign Service, and the fitting out or equipping in His Majesty's Dominions Vessels for warlike Purposes, without His Majesty's Licence.	The whole act.
4 Geo. 4. c. 77	Importation, etc., in Foreign Vessels Act 1823	An Act passed in the Fourth Year of the Reign of His late Majesty King George the Fourth, intituled An Act to authorise His Majesty, under certain Circumstances, to regulate the Duties and Drawbacks on Goods imported or exported in Foreign Vessels, and to exempt certain Foreign Vessels from Pilotage.	As the said Act is amended by an Act passed in the Fifth Year of the Reign of His present Majesty for that Purpose. (Note: Duties on Foreign Vessels Act 1824 (5 G. 4. c. 1))
37 Geo. 3. c. 117	Trade with India Act 1797	An Act passed in the Thirty-seventh Year of the Reign of His Majesty King George the Third, intituled An Act for regulating the Trade to be carried on with the British Possessions in India by the Ships of Nations in amity with His Majesty.	The whole act.
4 Geo. 4. c. 80	Lascars Act 1823	An Act passed in the Fourth Year of the Reign of His late Majesty King George the Fourth, intituled An Act to consolidate and amend the several Laws now in force with respect to Trade from and to Places within the Limits of the Charter of the East India Company, and so much further Provisions with respect to such Trade; and to amend an Act of the present Session of Parliament, for the registering of Vessels, so far as relates to Vessels registered in India.	The whole act.
4 Geo. 4. c. 88	Passenger Vessels (No. 2) Act 1823	An Act passed in the Fourth Year of the Reign of His late Majesty King George the Fourth, intituled An Act for regulating Vessels carrying Passengers between Great Britain and Ireland.	The whole act.
55 eoG. 3. c. 57	South Sea Company Act 1815	An Act passed in the Fifty-fifth Year of the Reign of His Majesty King George the Third, intituled An Act to repeal the Provisions of former Acts granting exclusive Privileges of Trade to the South Sea Company, and for indemnifying the said Company for the Loss of such Privileges.	The whole act.
55 Geo. 3. c. 141	South Sea Company's Privileges Act 1815	Another Act passed in the Fifty-fifth Year of the Reign of King George the Third, made for amending the said last-mentioned Act.	The whole act.
5 Geo. 4. c. 64	Fisheries Act 1824	An Act passed in the Fifth Year of the Reign of His late Majesty King George the Fourth, intituled An Act to amend the several Acts for the Encouragement and Improvement of the British and Irish Fisheries	All other Acts and Parts of Acts relating to the said Fisheries which were in force upon the said Fifth Day of January One thousand eight hundred and twenty-six.
6 & 7 Will. 3. c. 10	Newcastle (Sale of Coal by Measured Keel) Act 1694	An Act passed in the Sixth and Seventh Year of the Reign of King William the Third, and another Act passed in the Fifteenth Year of the Reign of His late Majesty King George the Third, and another Act passed in the Thirty-first Year of the Reign of His said Majesty, which several Acts relate to certain Coal Boats and Carriages, and for loading Coals on board Ship.	The whole act.
15 Geo. 3. c. 27	Measurement of Coal Wagons, etc. Act 1775	An Act passed in the Sixth and Seventh Year of the Reign of King William the Third, and another Act passed in the Fifteenth Year of the Reign of His late Majesty King George the Third, and another Act passed in the Thirty-first Year of the Reign of His said Majesty, which several Acts relate to certain Coal Boats and Carriages, and for loading Coals on board Ship.	The whole act.
31 Geo. 3. c 36	Newcastle (Sale of Coal by Measured Keel) Act 1791	An Act passed in the Sixth and Seventh Year of the Reign of King William the Third, and another Act passed in the Fifteenth Year of the Reign of His late Majesty King George the Third, and another Act passed in the Thirty-first Year of the Reign of His said Majesty, which several Acts relate to certain Coal Boats and Carriages, and for loading Coals on board Ship.	The whole act.
6 Geo. 4. c. 78	Quarantine Act 1825	An Act passed in the Sixth Year of the Reign of His late Majesty King George the Fourth, intituled An Act to repeal the several Laws relating to the Performance of Quarantine, and to make other Provisions in lieu thereof	The whole act.
43 Geo. 3. c. 25	Parliamentary Elections (Ireland) Act 1803	An Act passed in the Forty-third Year of His late Majesty King George the Third, intituled An Act for the better securing the Freedom of Elections of Members to serve in Parliament for any Place in Ireland, by disabling certain Officers employed in the Collection or Management of His Majesty's Revenue in Ireland from giving their Votes at such Elections.	The whole act.
4 Geo. 4. c. 25	Merchant Seamen, etc. Act 1823	An Act passed in the Fourth Year of the Reign of His late Majesty King George the Fourth, intituled An Act for regulating the Number of Apprentices to be taken on board British Merchant Vessels, and for preventing the deserting of Seamen therefrom.	And which Act it is hereby declared and enacted both and shall extend to Ireland.
21 & 22 Geo. 3 c. 17 (I.)	N/A	An Act made in the Parliament of Ireland in the Twenty-first and Twenty-second Years of the Reign of His late Majesty King George the Third, for the Improvement of the City of Dublin by making wide and convenient Passages through the same, and for regulating the Coal Trade thereof.	And any Act or Acts for amending or continuing the same. And also save and except all such Acts and Parts of Acts as relate to the maintaining or improving of any Harbours, Havens, Ports, Rivers, Piers, Lighthouses, Docks, Canals, Basins, or Warehouses. And also all Acts and Parts of Acts which are of a local or personal Nature, not being Public General Acts, although declared public. And also all Acts and Parts of Acts whereby any Duties are made applicable to any particular Purpose, or for the Use or Benefit of any particular Person or Persons, or Body or Bodies Corporate or Politic, or of any particular Company. And also all Acts whereby any Drawback of Duty is granted in respect of Materials used in building of Churches and Chapels. and also all Acts and Parts of Acts relating to the Excise, so far as the Provisions of any of such Acts might and are to be put in force by the Commissioners of the Excise or their Officers in the United Kingdom, or by the Commissioners of Customs or their Officers in Ireland.
7 Geo. 4. c. 53	Importation of Silk Act 1826	An Act passed in the Seventh Year of the Reign of His late Majesty King George the Fourth, intituled An Act to regulate the Importation of Silk Goods until the Tenth Day of October One thousand eight hundred and twenty-eight, and to encourage the Silk Manufacture, by granting certain Duties, as relates to the Revenue of Excise.	The whole act.
7 Geo. 4. c. 54	Aliens Act 1826	An Act passed in the Seventh Year of the Reign of His late Majesty King George the Fourth, intituled An Act for Regulation of Aliens.	The whole act.
9 Geo. 4. c. 18	Stamp Duties on Cards and Dice Act 1828	An Act passed in the Ninth Year of the Reign of His late Majesty King George the Fourth, intituled An Act to repeal the Stamp Duties on Cards and Dice made in the United Kingdom, and to grant other Duties in lieu thereof, and to amend and consolidate the Acts relating to such Cards and Dice, and the Importation thereof.	The whole act.
9 Geo. 4. c. 21	Passengers in Merchant Vessels Act 1828	An Act passed in the Ninth Year of the Reign of His late Majesty King George the Fourth, intituled An Act to regulate the Carriage of Passengers in Merchant Vessels from the United Kingdom to the Continent and Islands of North America.	The whole act.
9 Geo. 4. c. 44	Excise Act 1828	An Act passed in the Ninth Year of the Reign of His late Majesty King George the Fourth, intituled An Act to provide for the Execution throughout the United Kingdom of the several Laws of Excise relating to Licences and Survey on Tea, Coffee, Cocoa, Pepper, Tobacco, Snuff, Foreign and Colonial Spirits and Wine, notwithstanding the Transfer to the Customs of the Import Duties on any of such Commodities.	The whole act.
9 Geo. 4. c. 60	Importation of Corn Act 1828	An Act passed in the Ninth Year of the Reign of His late Majesty King George the Fourth, intituled An Act to amend the Laws relating to the Importation of Corn.	The whole act.
9 Geo. 4. c. 93	Delivery of Sugar Out of Bond Act 1828	An Act passed in the Ninth Year of the Reign of His late Majesty King George the Fourth, intituled An Act to allow Sugar to be delivered out of Warehouse to be refined.	As relates to the ascertaining and publishing of the average Price of Sugar.
11 Geo. 4 & 1 Will. 4. c. 44 (Note: Cited as 1 W. 4. c. 44 in the act.)	Arms (Ireland) Act 1830	An Act passed in the First Year of the Reign of His present Majesty King William the Fourth, intituled An Act to regulate for One Year the Importation of Arms, Gunpowder, and Ammunition into Ireland, and the making, selling, and keeping of Arms, Gunpowder, and Ammunition in Ireland.	The whole act.
11 Geo. 4 & 1 Will. 4. c. 45 (Note: Cited as 1 W. 4. c. 45 in the act.)	Customs Act 1830	An Act passed in the First Year of the Reign of His present Majesty King William the Fourth, intituled An Act to subject to Duties of Customs Goods the Property of the Crown, in case of Sale after Importation.	The whole act.
1 & 2 Will. 4. c. 4	Excise Declarations Act 1831	An Act passed in the First and Second Year of the Reign of His present Majesty King William the Fourth, intituled An Act to abolish certain Oaths and Affirmations taken and made in the Customs and Excise Departments of His Majesty's Revenue, and to substitute Declarations in lieu thereof.	As relates to the Department of Excise.
1 & 2 Will. 4. c. 13	Tobacco Cultivation Act 1831	An Act passed in the First and Second Year of the Reign of His present Majesty King William the Fourth, intituled An Act to repeal an Act of the Nineteenth Year of King George the Third, for repealing so much of several Acts as prohibit the Growth and Produce of Tobacco in Ireland, and to permit the Importation of Tobacco of the Growth and Produce of that Kingdom into Great Britain.	The whole act.
2 & 3 Will. 4. c. 70	Arms (Ireland) Act 1832	An Act passed in the Second and Third Year of the Reign of His present Majesty King William the Fourth, intituled An Act to continue for One Year, and from thence to the End of the then next Session of Parliament, several Acts relating to the Importation and keeping of Arms and Gunpowder in Ireland.	The whole act.
2 & 3 Will. 4. c. 90	Dublin Coal Meters, etc. Act 1832	An Act passed in the Second and Third Year of the Reign of His present Majesty King William the Fourth, intituled An Act to authorise the Lords Commissioners of His Majesty's Treasury to grant Compensation to the Inspectors and Coal Meters of the City of Dublin, and to impose a Rate upon Coals imported into the Port of Dublin, to provide a Fund for such Compensation.	The whole act.

Section 4 of the act further repealed parts of 2 acts, to take effect on 1 January 1834:

Citation	Short Title	Title	Extent of repeal
6 Geo. 3. c. 52	Customs, etc. Act 1766	An Act passed in the Sixth Year of the Reign of King George the Third, intituled An Act for repealing certain Duties in the British Colonies and Plantations granted by several Acts of Parliament, and also the Duties imposed by an Act made in the last Session of Parliament upon certain East India Goods exported from Great Britain, and for granting other Duties instead thereof; and for further encouraging, regulating, and securing several Branches of the Trade of this Kingdom and the British Dominions in America.	As imposes a Duty on Coffee the Growth or Produce of any British Colony or Plantation in America on Importation thereof into any other such Colony or Plantation.
14 Geo. 3. c. 88	Quebec Finance Act 1774	Another Act passed in the Fourteenth Year of the same Reign, intituled An Act to establish a Fund towards further defraying the Charges of the Administration of Justice and Support of the Civil Government within the province of Quebec in America.	As imposes any Duties on Molasses and Syrups imported or brought into Canada.

Section 5 of the act provided that nothing in the act would extend to prevent any foreign seaman employed in navigating any vessel in the Southern Whale Fishery under the authority of Southern Whale Fisheries Act 1795 (35 G. 3. c. 92) or Customs Act 1826 (7 G. 4. c. 48) from continuing such employment with the "rights and privileges of British Seamen".

Section 6 of the act provided that the act may be altered, varies or repealed by any act passed in the present session.

== See also ==
- Statute Law Revision Act
