= Pilotage Act 1825 =

Act of the Parliament of the United Kingdom

- Act of Parliament
- Parliament of the United Kingdom
- Long title: An Act for the Amendment of the Law respecting Pilots and Pilotage; and also for the better Preservation of Floating Lights, Buoys and Beacons.
- Citation: 6 Geo. 4. c. 125
- Territorial extent: United Kingdom

Dates
- Royal assent: 5 July 1825
- Commencement: 5 July 1825 (Note: The Acts of Parliament (Commencement) Act 1793.)
- Repealed: 1 May 1855
Other legislation
Repeals/revokes	See § Repealed enactments
Amended by	Cinque Ports Pilots Act 1828
Repealed by	Merchant Shipping Repeal Act 1854

Status: Repealed

Text of statute as originally enacted

The Pilotage Act 1825 (6 Geo. 4. c. 125) was an act of the Parliament of the United Kingdom that consolidated and amended the law relating to maritime pilots and pilotage, and made provision for the preservation of floating lights, buoys, and beacons.

== Provisions ==
=== Repealed enactments ===
Section 1 of the act repealed 2 enactments, listed in that section. The repeal did not extend to any rate of pilotage due or to become due, to any penalty or forfeiture incurred or to be incurred, or to any other act, matter, or thing done or to be done, before the commencement of the operation of the provisions of the act, in relation to any such matters.

Citation	Short title	Description	Extent of repeal
52 Geo. 3. c. 39	Pilotage Act 1812	An Act for the more effectual Regulation of Pilots, and of the Pilotage of Ships and Vessels on the Coast of England.	The whole act.
55 Geo. 3. c. 87	Pilotage of Foreign Vessels Act 1815	An Act to relieve certain Foreign Vessels resorting to the Port of London, in respect of Pilotage; and to regulate the Mode of Payment of Pilotage on Foreign Vessels in the said Port.	The whole act.

== Subsequent developments ==
The act was amended by the Cinque Ports Pilots Act 1828 (9 Geo. 4. c. 86).

The whole act was repealed by section 4 of, and the first schedule to, the Merchant Shipping Repeal Act 1854 (17 & 18 Vict. c. 120), which came into operation on 1 May 1855.
