= Customs (Repeal) Act 1845 =

Act of the Parliament of the United Kingdom

- Act of Parliament
- Parliament of the United Kingdom
- Long title: An Act to repeal the several Laws relating to the Customs.
- Citation: 8 & 9 Vict. c. 84
- Introduced by: Henry Goulburn MP (Commons)
- Territorial extent: United Kingdom

Dates
- Royal assent: 4 August 1845
- Commencement: 4 August 1845 (Note: Section 1.)
- Repealed: 11 August 1875
Other legislation
Amends	See § Repealed enactments
Repeals/revokes	See § Repealed enactments
Repealed by	Statute Law Revision Act 1875
Relates to	Customs Law Repeal Act 1825; Customs Act 1826; Excise Management Act 1827; Customs (Repeal) Act 1833; Commissioners of Customs Act 1845; Customs (No. 3) Act 1845; Prevention of Smuggling Act 1845; Shipping, etc. Act 1845; Registering of British Vessels Act 1845; Duties of Customs Act 1845; Warehousing of Goods Act 1845; Customs (No. 4) Act 1845; Trade of British Possessions Act 1845; Isle of Man Trade Act 1845; Customs Consolidation Act 1853; Merchant Shipping Act 1854; Supplemental Customs Consolidation Act 1855; Customs Consolidation Act 1876

Status: Repealed

Text of statute as originally enacted

The Customs (Repeal) Act 1845 (8 & 9 Vict. c. 84) was an act of the Parliament of the United Kingdom that repealed various statutes relating to customs in the United Kingdom.

== Background ==
In the United Kingdom, acts of Parliament remain in force until expressly repealed. Blackstone's Commentaries on the Laws of England, published in the late 18th-century, raised questions about the system and structure of the common law and the poor drafting and disorder of the existing statute book.

In 1806, the Commission on Public Records passed a resolution requesting the production of a report on the best mode of reducing the volume of the statute book. From 1810 to 1825, The Statutes of the Realm was published, providing for the first time the authoritative collection of acts.

By the early 19th century, British customs law, relating to trade, navigation, the import and export of goods, and the collection of customs revenue, had become increasingly intricate and difficult to navigate due to the large number of acts passed that had accumulated over many years. This complexity posed challenges for both commerce and law enforcement. The preamble of the Act acknowledged that the existing system had become an impediment to trade and the "Ends of Justice".

In 1810, the Lords of the Treasury asked Nicholas Jickling to produce a Digest of the Laws of the Customs, which was published in 1815, numbering 1,375 pages from the earliest period to 53 Geo. 3. This Digest was continuously published to bring the state of the law up to date to the end of every session. In 1814, the Commission of Public Records published their 14th Report, recommending consolidation of the statute law.

In 1822, the Navigation and Commerce Act 1822 (3 Geo. 4. c. 43) was passed to encourage shipping and navigation. The Repeal of Acts Concerning Importation Act 1822 (3 Geo. 4. c. 41) and the Repeal of Acts Concerning Importation (No. 2) Act 1822 (3 Geo. 4. c. 42) were passed at the same time to repealed related inconsistent or obsolete enactments.

In 1823, the Customs and Excise Act 1823 (4 Geo. 4. c. 23) was passed, which consolidate the several Boards of Customs, and also, the several Boards of Excise across the United Kingdom.

By a letter dated 9 August 1823, Secretary to the Treasury, John Charles Herries MP, asked J. D. Hume, Controller of the Port of London, to "undertake the preparation of a general law, or set of laws, for the consolidation of the customs of the United Kingdom".

The original plan for the consolidation was outlined in a letter dated 18 November 1824, from Mr. Herries, Secretary of the Treasury, to the Customs Commissioners, proposing: The plan proposed a two-pronged approach:

1. Specific repeal: Identifying and listing specific acts and parts of acts to be repealed, ensuring their removal from the statute book.
2. General description: Implementing a general repeal clause to address any potential omissions and provide legal clarity.

Despite the intention to create a new legal code that would supersede all previous customs laws, with a declaration that no law predating the new code would remain in force, the general repeal clause was withdrawn, the operation of the repeal of the enumerated acts was postponed for six months and full implementation of the new consolidated code was deferred to a future date.

On 15 April 1825, the Committee on Customs and Excise Consolidation Acts reported and resolved that it was "expedient to repeal the several Laws relating to the Customs now in force; and to consolidate the various enactments therein contained."

In 1826, eleven customs acts were passed to consolidate to all practical purposes the whole statute law of the customs by repealing the numerous existing customs statutes and replace them with new, more clearly written laws. The acts simplified tariff schedules, to make it easier for traders to understand duties, revised penalties for customs offences to ensure fair and consistent enforcement and introduced standardised procedures for customs declarations, to reduce administrative burdens and increase efficiency at ports.

- Customs, etc. Act 1825 (9 Geo. 4. c. 106)
- Customs, etc. (No. 2) Act 1825 (9 Geo. 4. c. 107)
- Customs, etc. (No. 3) Act 1825 (6 Geo. 4. c. 108)
- Customs, etc. (No. 4) Act 1825 (6 Geo. 4. c. 109)
- Customs, etc. (No. 5) Act 1825 (6 Geo. 4. c. 110)
- Customs, etc. (No. 6) Act 1825 (6 Geo. 4. c. 111)
- Customs, etc. (No. 7) Act 1825 (6 Geo. 4. c. 112)
- Customs, etc. (No. 8) Act 1825 (6 Geo. 4. c. 113)
- Customs, etc. (No. 9) Act 1825 (6 Geo. 4. c. 114)
- Customs, etc. (No. 10) Act 1825 (6 Geo. 4. c. 115)
- Passenger Vessels Act 1825 (6 Geo. 4 c. 116)

In 1825, the Customs Law Repeal Act 1825 (6 Geo. 4. c. 105) was passed to repeal 443 related enactments. In 1826, the Customs Act 1826 (7 Geo. 4. c. 48) was passed, which reversed the repeal of several enactments.

In 1827, the Excise Management Act 1827 (7 & 8 Geo. 4. c. 53) was passed, which consolidated enactments relating to the collection and management of customs.

In 1833, eleven customs acts were passed to further amend and consolidate the customs law:

- Customs, etc. Act 1833 (3 & 4 Will. 4. c. 51)
- Customs, etc. (No. 2) Act 1833 (3 & 4 Will. 4. c. 52)
- Customs, etc. (No. 3) Act 1833 (3 & 4 Will. 4. c. 53)
- Customs, etc. (No. 4) Act 1833 (3 & 4 Will. 4. c. 54)
- Customs, etc. (No. 5) Act 1833 (3 & 4 Will. 4. c. 55)
- Customs, etc. (No. 6) Act 1833 (3 & 4 Will. 4. c. 56)
- Customs, etc. (No. 7) Act 1833 (3 & 4 Will. 4. c. 57)
- Customs, etc. (No. 8) Act 1833 (3 & 4 Will. 4. c. 58)
- Customs, etc. (No. 9) Act 1833 (3 & 4 Will. 4. c. 59)
- Customs, etc. (No. 10) Act 1833 (3 & 4 Will. 4. c. 60)
- Customs, etc. (No. 11) Act 1833 (3 & 4 Will. 4. c. 61)

In 1833, the Customs (Repeal) Act 1833 (3 & 4 Will. 4. c. 50) was passed to repeal 24 related enactments.

On 19 July 1844, the Committee on Customs Acts resolved to bring in bring in Bills, to further amend and consolidate the customs law:

- To repeal the several Laws relating to the Customs:
- For the Management of the Customs
- For granting Duties of Customs
- For the Warehousing of Goods
- For the Registering of British Vessels
- For the Encouragement of British Shipping and Navigation
- To regulate the Trade of British Possessions Abroad
- To grant certain Bounties and Allowances of Customs
- For the Regulating the Trade of the Isle of Man
- For the Prevention of Smuggling
- For the general Regulation of the Customs

== Passage ==
The Customs Laws Repeal Bill had ts first reading in the House of Commons on 19 July 1845, presented by the chancellor of the exchequer, Henry Goulburn MP. The bill had its second reading in the House of Commons on 23 July 1845 and was committed to a Committee of the Whole House, which met on 25 July 1845 and reported on 28 July 1845, with amendments. The amended bill had its third reading in the House of Commons on 29 July 1845 and passed, without amendments.

The bill had its first reading in the House of Lords on 29 July 1845. The bill had its second reading in House of Lords on 31 July 1845 and was committed to a Committee of the Whole House, which met and reported on 1 August 1845, without amendments. The bill had its third reading in the House of Lords on 2 August 1845 and passed, without amendments.

The bill was granted royal assent on 4 August 1875.

== Subsequent developments ==
In 1845, 10 customs acts were passed to further amend and consolidate the customs law:

- Commissioners of Customs Act 1845 (8 & 9 Vict. c. 85)
- Customs (No. 3) Act 1845 (8 & 9 Vict. c. 86)
- Prevention of Smuggling Act 1845 (8 & 9 Vict. c. 87)
- Shipping, etc. Act 1845 (8 & 9 Vict. c. 89)
- Registering of British Vessels Act 1845 (8 & 9 Vict. c. 90)
- Duties of Customs Act 1845 (8 & 9 Vict. c. 91)
- Warehousing of Goods Act 1845 (8 & 9 Vict. c. 92)
- Customs (No. 4) Act 1845 (8 & 9 Vict. c. 93)
- Trade of British Possessions Act 1845 (8 & 9 Vict. c. 94)
- Isle of Man Trade Act 1845 (8 & 9 Vict. c. 95)

In 1853, Customs Consolidation Act 1853 (16 & 17 Vict. c. 107) was passed to consolidate the customs law.

The whole act was repealed by section 1 of, and the schedule to, the Statute Law Revision Act 1875 (38 & 39 Vict. c. 66), which came into force on 11 August 1875.

== Repealed enactments ==
Section 2 of the act repealed 26 enactments, listed in that section, to take effect on the passing of the act. The section included exceptions for:

1. Any repeals of former acts contained within the acts being repealed, which remain in effect.
2. Arrears of duties or drawbacks that had become due and payable prior to this act.
3. Any penalty or forfeiture which had been incurred under the previous acts.

Section 3 of the act provided that all orders in council, bonds, licenses etc. done under repealed acts would remain valid, notwithstanding the repeal.

Citation	Short title	Title	Extent of repeal
11 G. 4 & 1 W. 4. c. 45	Customs Act 1830	An Act passed in the Reign of King William the Fourth, intituled An Act to subject to Duties of Customs Goods the Property of the Crown, in case of Sale after Importation.	The whole act.
3 & 4 W. 4. c. 51	Customs, etc. Act 1833	An Act passed in the Session of Parliament holden in the Third and Fourth Years of the Reign of King William the Fourth, intituled An Act for the Management of the Customs.	The whole act.
3 & 4 W. 4. c. 52	Customs, etc. (No. 2) Act 1833	An Act passed in the same Session of Parliament, intituled An Act for the general Regulation of the Customs.	The whole act.
3 & 4 W. 4. c. 53	Customs, etc. (No. 3) Act 1833	An Act passed in the same Session of Parliament, intituled An Act for the Prevention of Smuggling.	The whole act.
3 & 4 W. 4. c. 54	Customs, etc. (No. 4) Act 1833	An Act passed in the same Session of Parliament, intituled An Act for the Encouragement of British Shipping and Navigation.	The whole
3 & 4 W. 4. c. 55	Customs, etc. (No. 5) Act 1833	An Act passed in the same Session of Parliament, intituled An Act for the registering of British Vessels.	The whole act.
3 & 4 W. 4. c. 56	Customs, etc. (No. 6) Act 1833	An Act passed in the same Session of Parliament, intituled An Act for granting Duties of Customs.	The whole act.
3 & 4 W. 4. c. 57	Customs, etc. (No. 7) Act 1833	An Act passed in the same Session of Parliament, intituled An Act for the warehousing of Goods.	The whole act.
3 & 4 W. 4. c. 58	Customs, etc. (No. 8) Act 1833	An Act passed in the same Session of Parliament, intituled An Act to grant certain Bounties and Allowances of Customs.	The whole act.
3 & 4 W. 4. c. 59	Customs, etc. (No. 9) Act 1833	An Act passed in the same Session of Parliament, intituled An Act to regulate the Trade of the British Possessions abroad.	The whole act.
3 & 4 W. 4. c. 60	Customs, etc. (No. 10) Act 1833	An Act passed in the same Session of Parliament, intituled An Act for regulating the Trade of the Isle of Man.	
3 & 4 W. 4. c. 61	Customs, etc. (No. 11) Act 1833	An Act passed in the same Session of Parliament, intituled An Act to admit Sugar without Payment of Duty to be refined in bond for Exportation.	The whole act.
4 & 5 W. 4. c. 13	Smuggling Act 1834	An Act passed in the Fourth Year of the Reign of King William the Fourth, intituled An Act to repeal so much of an Act of the last Session of Parliament for the Prevention of Smuggling as authorizes Magistrates to sentence Persons convicted of certain Offences to serve His Majesty in His Naval Service.	The whole act.
4 & 5 W. 4. c. 89	Customs Act 1834	An Act passed in the Session of Parliament holden in the Fourth and Fifth Years of the Reign of King William the Fourth, intituled An Act to amend the Laws relating to the Customs.	Except so much thereof as relates to Steam Vessels carrying Passengers between Great Britain and Ireland.
5 & 6 W. 4. c. 56	Tonnage, etc., of Ships Act 1835	An Act passed in the Session of Parliament holden in the Fifth and Sixth Years of the Reign of King William the Fourth, intituled An Act to regulate the Admeasurement of the Tonnage and Burden of the Shipping of the United Kingdom.	The whole act.
5 & 6 W. 4. c. 66	Customs Act 1835	An Act passed in the same Session of Parliament, intituled An Act to amend the Laws relating to the Customs	The whole act.
6 & 7 W. 4. c. 60	Customs Act 1836	An Act passed in the Session of Parliament holden in the Sixth and Seventh Years of the Reign of King William the Fourth, intituled An Act to amend the Laws relating to the Customs.	The whole act.
1 & 2 Vict. c. 113	Customs Act 1838	An Act passed in the Session of Parliament holden in the First and Second Years of the Reign of Her present Majesty, intituled An Act to amend the Laws relating to the Customs	Except so much thereof as relates to the Conveyance of Passengers in Merchant Vessels.
5 & 6 Vict. c. 47	Customs Act 1842	An Act passed in the Session of Parliament holden in the Fifth and Sixth Years of the Reign of Her present Majesty, intituled An Act to amend the Laws relating to the Customs.	Except so much thereof as relates to the Sale and the Assay of Foreign Gold and Silver Plate.
5 & 6 Vict. c. 49	Colonial Duties Act 1842	An Act passed in the same Session of Parliament, intituled An Act to amend the Laws for the Regulation of the Trade of British Possessions abroad.	The whole act.
5 & 6 Vict. c. 56	Customs (Amendment) Act 1842	An Act passed in the same Session of Parliament, intituled An Act for further amending the Laws relating to the Customs.	Except so much thereof as relates to Gold and Silver Plate.
6 & 7 Vict. c. 84	Customs Act 1843	An Act passed in the Session of Parliament holden in the Sixth and Seventh Years of the Reign of Her present Majesty, intituled An Act to amend the Laws of Customs.	The whole act.
7 & 8 Vict. c. 16	Customs Act 1844	An Act passed in the Session of Parliament holden in the Seventh and Eighth Years of the Reign of Her present Majesty, intituled An Act to amend the Laws relating to the Customs.	The whole act.
7 & 8 Vict. c. 43	Isle of Man Customs Act 1844	An Act passed in the same Session of Parliament, intituled An Act to amend the Laws relating to the Customs in the Isle of Man.	The whole act.
8 & 9 Vict. c. 12	Customs Act 1845	An Act passed in this present Session of Parliament, intituled An Act to alter and amend certain Duties of Customs.	The whole act.
8 & 9 Vict. c. 45	Timber Ships Act 1845	Another Act passed in this present Session of Parliament, intituled An Act to make perpetual and amend an Act of the Fifth and Sixth Years of Her present Majesty, for preventing Ships clearing out from any British Port from loading any Part of their Cargo upon Deck.	The whole act.

== See also ==
- Statute Law Revision Act
