= Customs Duties Consolidation Act 1860 =

Act of the Parliament of the United Kingdom

Customs Duties Consolidation Act 1860 (Note: Section 7.)
- Act of Parliament
- Parliament of the United Kingdom
- Long title: An Act to consolidate the Duties of Customs.
- Citation: 23 & 24 Vict. c. 110
- Territorial extent: United Kingdom

Dates
- Royal assent: 28 August 1860
- Commencement: 28 August 1860 (Note: Section 7.)
- Repealed: 16 August 1878

Other legislation
- Amends: Customs Consolidation Act 1853
- Repealed by: Statute Law Revision Act 1878
- Relates to: Customs Tariff Amendment Act 1860

Status: Repealed

Text of statute as originally enacted

The Customs Duties Consolidation Act 1860 (23 & 24 Vict. c. 110) was an act of the Parliament of the United Kingdom that consolidated the duties of customs in the United Kingdom.

== Provisions ==
=== Repealed enactments ===
Section 2 of the act repealed so much of the Customs Consolidation Act 1853 (16 & 17 Vict. c. 107), as prohibits the Importation of Malt into the United Kingdom.

== Subsequent developments ==
The whole act was repealed by section 1 of, and the first schedule to, the Statute Law Revision Act 1878 (41 & 42 Vict. c. 79), which came into force on 16 August 1878.
