= Steam Navigation Act 1851 =

Act of the Parliament of the United Kingdom

Steam Navigation Act 1851 (Note: Section 51.)
- Act of Parliament
- Parliament of the United Kingdom
- Long title: An Act to consolidate and amend the Laws relating to the Regulation of Steam Navigation, and to the Boats and Lights to be carried by Sea-going Vessels.
- Citation: 14 & 15 Vict. c. 79
- Territorial extent: United Kingdom

Dates
- Royal assent: 7 August 1851
- Commencement: 31 December 1851
- Repealed: 1 May 1855
Other legislation
Repeals/revokes	Steam Navigation Act 1846; Steam Navigation Act 1848
Repealed by	Merchant Shipping Repeal Act 1854

Status: Repealed

Text of statute as originally enacted

The Steam Navigation Act 1851 (14 & 15 Vict. c. 79) was an act of the Parliament of the United Kingdom that consolidated enactments related to steam navigation in the United Kingdom.

The act expanded on the requirements of previous acts, applying them to all steam or sail vessels and empowering the Admiralty to establish regulations for boats to carry lights to prevent collisions.

== Provisions ==
Section 1 of the act repealed the Steam Navigation Act 1846 (9 & 10 Vict. c. 100) and the Steam Navigation Act 1848 (11 & 12 Vict. c. 81).

== Subsequent developments ==
The whole act was repealed by section 4 of, and the schedule to, the Merchant Shipping Repeal Act 1854 (17 & 18 Vict. c. 120), which came into force on 1 May 1855.
