= Customs Act 1826 =

Act of the Parliament of the United Kingdom

- Act of Parliament
- Parliament of the United Kingdom
- Long title: An Act to alter and amend the several Laws relating to the Customs.
- Citation: 7 Geo. 4. c. 48
- Introduced by: John Charles Herries MP (Commons)
- Territorial extent: United Kingdom

Dates
- Royal assent: 26 May 1826
- Commencement: 5 July 1826 (Note: Section 1.)
- Repealed: 5 August 1873
Other legislation
Amends	Customs, etc. Act 1825; Customs Law Repeal Act 1825; Customs, etc. (No. 2) Act 1825; Customs, etc. (No. 3) Act 1825; Customs, etc. (No. 4) Act 1825; Customs, etc. (No. 5) Act 1825; Customs, etc. (No. 6) Act 1825; Customs, etc. (No. 7) Act 1825; Customs, etc. (No. 8) Act 1825; Customs, etc. (No. 9) Act 1825; See § Repealed enactments.
Repeals/revokes	Wine, etc., Duties Act 1825; American and West Indian Trade Act 1825; Duties on Mauritius Act 1825; Customs Act 1825; See § Repealed enactments.
Amended by	Statute Law Revision Act 1863
Repealed by	Statute Law Revision Act 1873
Relates to	Customs Act 1825; Customs Law Repeal Act 1825; Customs, etc. Act 1825; Customs, etc. (No. 2) Act 1825; Customs, etc. (No. 3) Act 1825

Status: Repealed

Text of statute as originally enacted

The Customs Act 1826 (7 Geo. 4. c. 48) was an act of the Parliament of the United Kingdom that amended the law relating to customs in the United Kingdom.

== Background ==
In the United Kingdom, acts of Parliament remain in force until expressly repealed. Blackstone's Commentaries on the Laws of England, published in the late 18th century, raised questions about the system and structure of the common law and the poor drafting and disorder of the existing statute book.

In 1806, the Commission on Public Records passed a resolution requesting the production of a report on the best mode of reducing the volume of the statute book. From 1810 to 1825, The Statutes of the Realm was published, providing for the first time the authoritative collection of acts.

By the early 19th century, British customs law, relating to trade, navigation, the import and export of goods, and the collection of customs revenue, had become increasingly intricate and difficult to navigate due to the large number of acts passed that had accumulated over many years. This complexity posed challenges for both commerce and law enforcement. The preamble of the act acknowledged that the existing system had become an impediment to trade and the "Ends of Justice".

In 1810, the Lords of the Treasury asked Nicholas Jickling to produce a Digest of the Laws of the Customs, which was published in 1815, numbering 1,375 pages from the earliest period to 53 Geo. 3. This Digest was continuously published to bring the state of the law up to date to the end of every session. In 1814, the Commission of Public Records published their 14th Report, recommending consolidation of the statute law.

In 1822, the Navigation and Commerce Act 1822 (3 Geo. 4. c. 43) was passed to encourage shipping and navigation. The Repeal of Acts Concerning Importation Act 1822 (3 Geo. 4. c. 41) and the Repeal of Acts Concerning Importation (No. 2) Act 1822 (3 Geo. 4. c. 42) were passed at the same time to repealed related inconsistent or obsolete enactments.

In 1823, the Customs and Excise Act 1823 (4 Geo. 4. c. 23) was passed, which consolidate the several Boards of Customs, and also, the several Boards of Excise across the United Kingdom.

By a letter dated 9 August 1823, Secretary to the Treasury, John Charles Herries MP, asked J. D. Hume, Controller of the Port of London, to "undertake the preparation of a general law, or set of laws, for the consolidation of the customs of the United Kingdom".

The original plan for the consolidation was outlined in a letter dated November 18, 1824, from Mr. Herries, Secretary of the Treasury, to the Customs Commissioners, proposing: The plan proposed a two-pronged approach:

1. Specific repeal: Identifying and listing specific acts and parts of acts to be repealed, ensuring their removal from the statute book.
2. General description: Implementing a general repeal clause to address any potential omissions and provide legal clarity.

Despite the intention to create a new legal code that would supersede all previous customs laws, with a declaration that no law predating the new code would remain in force, the general repeal clause was withdrawn, the operation of the repeal of the enumerated acts was postponed for six months and full implementation of the new consolidated code was deferred to a future date.

On 15 April 1825, the Committee on Customs and Excise Consolidation Acts reported and resolved that it was "expedient to repeal the several Laws relating to the Customs now in force; and to consolidate the various enactments therein contained."

In 1825, eleven customs acts were passed to consolidate to all practical purposes the whole statute law of the customs by repealing the numerous existing customs statutes and replace them with new, more clearly written laws. The acts simplified tariff schedules, to make it easier for traders to understand duties, revised penalties for customs offences to ensure fair and consistent enforcement and introduced standardised procedures for customs declarations, to reduce administrative burdens and increase efficiency at ports.

- Customs, etc. Act 1825 (6 Geo. 4. c. 106)
- Customs, etc. (No. 2) Act 1825 (6 Geo. 4. c. 107)
- Customs, etc. (No. 3) Act 1825 (6 Geo. 4. c. 108)
- Customs, etc. (No. 4) Act 1825 (6 Geo. 4. c. 109)
- Customs, etc. (No. 5) Act 1825 (6 Geo. 4. c. 110)
- Customs, etc. (No. 6) Act 1825 (6 Geo. 4. c. 111)
- Customs, etc. (No. 7) Act 1825 (6 Geo. 4. c. 112)
- Customs, etc. (No. 8) Act 1825 (6 Geo. 4. c. 113)
- Customs, etc. (No. 9) Act 1825 (6 Geo. 4. c. 114)
- Customs, etc. (No. 10) Act 1825 (6 Geo. 4. c. 115)
- Passenger Vessels Act 1825 (6 Geo. 4 c. 116)

== Passage ==
The House of Commons resolved on 5 April 1826 to go into a committee of the whole house to consider the Customs Duties Collection Acts, which met on 6 April 1826 and reported on 7 April 1826, resolving to amend the laws relating to the customs.

Leave to bring in the Customs Collection Bill to the House of Commons was granted to James Brogden MP, the chancellor of the exchequer, Frederick John Robinson MP and John Charles Herries MP on 7 April 1826. The bill had its first reading in the House of Commons on 10 April 1826, presented by John Charles Herries MP. The bill had its second reading in the House of Commons on 12 April 1826 and was committed to a committee of the whole house, which met on 13 April 1826. A separate committee to consider the Customs, etc. (No. 8) Act 1825 (6 Geo. 4. c. 113), known as the Customs Bounties Act, was appointed on 26 April 1826 and met on 26 April 1826 and reported on 26 April 1826, resolving to further continue the nine-tenths the bounty on sugar. As such, the bill was committed to a committee of the whole house, which met and reported on 28 April 1826, with amendments. The amended bill was further considered on 1 May 1826 and had its third reading in the House of Commons on 4 May 1826 and passed, with amendments.

The Customs Duties bill had its first reading in the House of Lords on 5 May 1826. The bill had its second reading in the House of Lords on 8 May 1826 and was committed to a committee of the whole house, which met on reported on 9 May 1826, without amendments. The bill had its third reading in the House of Lords on 10 May 1826 and passed, without amendments.

The bill was granted royal assent on 26 May 1826.

== Provisions ==
=== Revived enactments ===
Section 50 of the act amended the Customs Law Repeal Act 1825 (6 Geo. 4. c. 105), reviving.

- The Trade of Sugar Colonies Act 1732 (6 Geo. 2. c. 13)
- The Merchant Seamen, etc. Act 1823 (4 Geo. 4. c. 25)
- The Parliamentary Elections (Ireland) Act 1803 (43 Geo. 3. c. 25)
- Duties on Tea, etc. (American Plantations) Act 1766 (7 Geo. 3. c. 46)
- Countervening Duties of Excise Act 1823 (4 Geo. 4. c. 30)

=== Repealed enactments ===
Section 51 of the act repealed the Wine, etc., Duties Act 1825 (6 Geo. 4. c. 13), the American and West Indian Trade Act 1825 (c. 73), the Duties on Mauritius Act 1825 (c. 76) and the Customs Act 1825 (c. 104).

Section 52 of the act repealed all acts relating to customs, navigation, smuggling, etc. with exceptions for enactments listed in that section, in addition .

Citation	Short title	Description	Extent of exception
18 Geo. 3. c. 12	Taxation of Colonies Act 1778	An Act passed in the Eighteenth Year of the Reign of His late Majesty King George the Third, intituled An Act for removing all Doubts and Apprehensions concerning Taxation by the Parliament of Great Britain in any of the Colonies, Provinces and Plantations in North America and the West Indies ; and for repealing so much of an Act made in the Seventh Year of the Reign of His late Majesty as imposes a Duty on Tea imported from Great Britain into any Colony or Plantation in America as relates thereto.	The whole act.
Any Act, or the Part of any Act now in force, which was passed prior to the last mentioned Act, and by which any Duties in any of the British Possessions in America were granted and still continue payable to the Crown, as relates to the Collection and Appropriation of such Duties.
31 Geo. 3. c. 31	Clergy Endowments (Canada) Act 1791	An Act passed in the Thirty first Year of the Reign of His late Majesty King George the Third, intituled An Act to repeal certain Parts of an Act passed in the Fourteenth Year of His Majesty's Reign, intituled An Act for making more effectual Provisions for the Government of the Province of Quebec in North America; and to make further Provisions for the Government of the said Province.	The whole act.
51 Geo. 3. c. 47	Commercial Treaty with Portugal Act 1811	An Act passed in the Fifty first Year of the Reign of His late Majesty King George the Third, intituled An Act for carrying into Effect the Provisions of a Treaty of Amity, Commerce and Navigation, concluded between His Majesty and His Royal Highness the Prince Regent of Portugal.	The whole act.
59 Geo. 3. c. 54	Treaty with United States, etc. Act 1819	An Act passed in the Fifty ninth Year of the Reign of His late Majesty King George the Third, intituled An Act to carry into Effect a Convention of Commerce concluded between His Majesty and the United States of America, and a Treaty with the Prince Regent of Portugal.	The whole act.
55 Geo. 3. c. 26	Importation Act 1815	An Act passed in the Fifty fifth Year of the Reign of His late Majesty, intituled An Act to amend the Laws now in force for regulating the Importation of Corn.	The whole act.
1 & 2 Geo. 4. c. 87	Importation and Exportation Act 1821	Another Act passed in the First and Second Year of the Reign of His present Majesty, intituled An Act to repeal certain Acts passed in the Thirty first, (Note: Importation and Exportation (No. 2) Act 1791 (31 Geo. 3. c. 30)) Thirty third, (Note: Importation and Exportation (No. 2) Act 1793 (33 Geo. 3. c. 65)) Forty fourth (Note: Importation and Exportation Act 1804 (44 Geo. 3. c. 109)) and Forty fifth (Note: Importation and Exportation (No. 2) Act 1805 (45 Geo. 3. c. 86)) Years of His late Majesty King George the Third, for regulating the Importation and Exportation of Corn, Grain, Meal and Flour into and from Great Britain, and to make further Provisions in lieu thereof.	The whole act.
3 Geo. 4. c. 60	Importation Act 1822	An Act passed in the Third Year of His present Majesty's Reign, intituled An Act to amend the Laws relating to the Importation of Corn.	The whole act.
6 Geo. 4. c. 64	Duty on Wheat Act 1825	An Act passed in the Sixth Year of the Reign of His present Majesty, intituled An Act to alter for One Year, and until the end of the then next Session of Parliament, the Duty on Wheat the Produce of the British Possessions in North America.	The whole act.
56 Geo. 3. c. 127	Exportation (No. 4) Act 1816	An Act passed in the Fifty sixth Year of the Reign of His late Majesty King George the Third, intituled An Act to reduce the Duty on the Exportation from Great Britain of Small Coals of a certain Description.	The whole act.
59 Geo. 3. c. 69	Foreign Enlistment Act 1819	An Act passed in the Fifty ninth Year of the Reign of His late Majesty King George the Third, intituled An Act to prevent the Enlisting or Engagement of His Majesty's Subjects to serve in Foreign Service, and the fitting out or equipping, in His Majesty's Dominions, Vessels for warlike Purposes, without His Majesty's Licence.	The whole act.
4 Geo. 4. c. 77	Importation, etc., in Foreign Vessels Act 1823	An Act passed in the Fourth Year of the Reign of His present Majesty, intituled An Act to authorize His Majesty, amended by under certain Circumstances, to regulate the Duties and Drawbacks on Goods imported or exported in Foreign Vessels, and to exempt certain Foreign Vessels from Pilotage.	As the said Act is amended by an Act passed in the Fifth Year of the Reign of His present Majesty for that Purpose. (Note: Duties on Foreign Vessels Act 1824 (5 Geo. 4. c. 1))
4 Geo. 4. c. 81	East India Company's Service Act 1823	An Act passed in the Fourth Year of the Reign of His present Majesty, intituled An Act to consolidate and amend the several Laws now in force with respect to Trade from and to Places within the Limits of the Charter of the East India Company, and to make further Provisions with respect to such Trade; and to amend an Act of the present Session of Parliament for the registering of Vessels so far as relates to Vessels registered in India.	The whole act.
4 Geo. 4. c. 88	Passenger Vessels (No. 2) Act 1823	An Act passed in the Fourth Year of the Reign of His present Majesty, intituled An Act for regulating Vessels carrying Passengers between Great Britain and Ireland.	The whole act.
55 Geo. 3. c. 57	South Sea Company Act 1815	Act passed in the Fifty fifth Year of the Reign of His late Majesty King George the Third, intituled An Act to repeal the Provisions of former Acts, granting exclusive Privileges of Trade to the South Sea Company, and to indemnify the said Company for the Loss of such Privileges.	The whole act.
55 Geo. 3. c. 141	South Sea Company's Privileges Act 1815	Another Act passed in the said Fifty fifth Year of the Reign of King George the Third, made for amending the said last mentioned Act; and also an Act passed in the Fifth Year of the Reign of His present Majesty, intituled An Act to amend the several Acts for the Encouragement and Improvement of the British and Irish Fisheries.	
All other Acts and Parts of Acts relating to the said Fisheries, which were in force upon the said Fifth Day of January One thousand eight hundred and twenty six.
6 & 7 Will. 3. c. 10	Newcastle (Sale of Coal by Measured Keel) Act 1694	An Act passed in the Sixth and Seventh Years of the Reign of King William the Third, which several Acts relate to certain Keel Boats and Carriages, and for loading Coals on board Ships.	The whole act.
15 Geo. 3. c. 27	Measurement of Coal Wagons, etc. Act 1775	Another Act passed in the Fifteenth Year of the Reign of His late Majesty King George the Third, which several Acts relate to certain Keel Boats and Carriages, and for loading Coals on board Ships.	The whole act.
31 Geo. 3. c. 36	Newcastle (Sale of Coal by Measured Keel) Act 1791	Another Act passed in the Thirty first Year of the Reign of His said Majesty, which several Acts relate to certain Keel Boats and Carriages, and for loading Coals on board Ships.	The whole act.
6 Geo. 4. c. 78	Quarantine Act 1825	An Act passed in the Sixth Year of the Reign of His present Majesty, intituled An Act to repeal the several Laws relating to the Performance of Quarantine, and to make other Provisions in lieu thereof.	The whole act.
43 Geo. 3. c. 25	Parliamentary Elections (Ireland) Act 1803	An Act passed in the Forty third Year of His late Majesty, intituled An Act for the better securing the Freedom of Elections of Members to serve in Parliament for any Place in Ireland, by disabling certain Officers employed in the Collection or Management of His Majesty's Revenues in Ireland from giving their Votes at such Elections.	The whole act.
4 Geo. 4. c. 25	Merchant Seamen, etc. Act 1823	An Act passed in the Fourth Year of the Reign of His present Majesty, intituled An Act for regulating the Number of Apprentices to be taken on board British Merchant Vessels, and for preventing the Desertion of Seamen therefrom ; and which Act it is hereby declared and enacted doth and shall extend to Ireland.	The whole act.
21 & 22 Geo. 3. c. 17	N/A	An Act made in the Parliament of Ireland in the Twenty first and Twenty second Years of the Reign of His said late Majesty, for the Improvement of the City of Dublin, by making wide and convenient Passages through the same, and for regulating the Coal Trade thereof.	The whole act.
Any Act or Acts for amending or continuing the same.
All such Acts and Parts of Acts as relate to the maintaining or improving of any Harbours, Havens, Ports, Rivers, Piers, Light Houses, Docks, Canals, Basons or Warehouses.
All Acts and Parts of Acts which are of a local or personal Nature, not being Public General Acts, although declared Public.
All Acts and Parts of Acts whereby any Duties are made applicable to any particular Purpose, or for the Use or Benefit of any particular Person or Persons, or Body or Bodies Corporate or Politic, or of any Society or Company.
All Acts whereby any Drawback or Duty is granted in respect of Materials used in building of Churches and Chapels.
All Acts and Parts of Acts relating to the Excise, so far only as the Provisions of any such Acts might and are to be put in force by the Commissioners of the Excise or their Officers in the United Kingdom, or by the Commissioners of Customs or their Officers in Ireland.
Any Acts which create or regulate any jurisdiction for the Trial of Offences in Ireland or Newfoundland, against the Laws of Customs, Navigation or Excise, as shall be in force immediately before the passing of this Act.

== Legacy ==
=== Subsequent developments ===
In 1827, the Excise Management Act 1827 (7 & 8 Geo. 4. c. 53) was passed, which consolidated enactments relating to the collection and management of customs.

In 1833, eleven customs acts were passed to further amend and consolidate the customs law:

- Customs, etc. Act 1833 (3 & 4 Will. 4. c. 51)
- Customs, etc. (No. 2) Act 1833 (3 & 4 Will. 4. c. 52)
- Customs, etc. (No. 3) Act 1833 (3 & 4 Will. 4. c. 53)
- Customs, etc. (No. 4) Act 1833 (3 & 4 Will. 4. c. 54)
- Customs, etc. (No. 5) Act 1833 (3 & 4 Will. 4. c. 55)
- Customs, etc. (No. 6) Act 1833 (3 & 4 Will. 4. c. 56)
- Customs, etc. (No. 7) Act 1833 (3 & 4 Will. 4. c. 57)
- Customs, etc. (No. 8) Act 1833 (3 & 4 Will. 4. c. 58)
- Customs, etc. (No. 9) Act 1833 (3 & 4 Will. 4. c. 59)
- Customs, etc. (No. 10) Act 1833 (3 & 4 Will. 4. c. 60)
- Customs, etc. (No. 11) Act 1833 (3 & 4 Will. 4. c. 61)

In 1845, 10 customs acts were passed to further amend and consolidate the customs law:

- Commissioners of Customs Act 1845 (8 & 9 Vict. c. 85)
- Customs (No. 3) Act 1845 (8 & 9 Vict. c. 86)
- Prevention of Smuggling Act 1845 (8 & 9 Vict. c. 87)
- Shipping, etc. Act 1845 (8 & 9 Vict. c. 89)
- Registering of British Vessels Act 1845 (8 & 9 Vict. c. 90)
- Duties of Customs Act 1845 (8 & 9 Vict. c. 91)
- Warehousing of Goods Act 1845 (8 & 9 Vict. c. 92)
- Customs (No. 4) Act 1845 (8 & 9 Vict. c. 93)
- Trade of British Possessions Act 1845 (8 & 9 Vict. c. 94)
- Isle of Man Trade Act 1845 (8 & 9 Vict. c. 95)

In 1845, the Customs (Repeal) Act 1845 (8 & 9 Vict. c. 84) was passed to repeal 26 related enactments.

In 1853, Customs Consolidation Act 1853 (16 & 17 Vict. c. 107) was passed to consolidate the customs law.

=== Repeal ===
The broad terms of the repeal in section 52 of the act were criticised by William Rogers, a member of the Board for the Revision of the Statute Law.

The whole act, except so much of section 52 as related to excise, was repealed by section 1 of, and the schedule to, the Statute Law Revision Act 1861 (24 & 25 Vict. c. 101), which came into force on 6 August 1861.

The whole act was repealed by section 1 of, and the schedule to, the Statute Law Revision Act 1873 (36 & 37 Vict. c. 91), which came into force on 5 August 1873.
