= Committee of the whole House (United Kingdom) =

Parliamentary proceedings of the Houses of Parliament

In the Parliament of the United Kingdom, the Committee of the whole House is a committee of the whole of one of the two Houses.

In the House of Commons, the Committee of the whole House is used instead of a public bill committee for the committee stage (clause-by-clause debate) of constitutional or ethical importance, or for contentious bills. The Finance Bill is always sent to a Committee of the whole House in the Commons. The sitting is presided over by the Chairman of Ways and Means, rather than the Speaker of the House, sitting in the clerk's chair (at the Table of the House) rather than the Speaker's chair normally occupied by the presiding officer, and is addressed as "Chair" instead of "Deputy speaker".

In the House of Lords, the Committee of the whole House examines the majority of bills.
