= List of acts of the Parliament of the United Kingdom from 1825 =

This is a complete list of acts of the Parliament of the United Kingdom for the year 1825.

Note that the first parliament of the United Kingdom was held in 1801; parliaments between 1707 and 1800 were either parliaments of Great Britain or of Ireland). For acts passed up until 1707, see the list of acts of the Parliament of England and the list of acts of the Parliament of Scotland. For acts passed from 1707 to 1800, see the list of acts of the Parliament of Great Britain. See also the list of acts of the Parliament of Ireland.

For acts of the devolved parliaments and assemblies in the United Kingdom, see the list of acts of the Scottish Parliament, the list of acts of the Northern Ireland Assembly, and the list of acts and measures of Senedd Cymru; see also the list of acts of the Parliament of Northern Ireland.

The number shown after each act's title is its chapter number. Acts passed before 1963 are cited using this number, preceded by the year(s) of the reign during which the relevant parliamentary session was held; thus the Union with Ireland Act 1800 is cited as "39 & 40 Geo. 3 c. 67", meaning the 67th act passed during the session that started in the 39th year of the reign of George III and which finished in the 40th year of that reign. Note that the modern convention is to use Arabic numerals in citations (thus "41 Geo. 3" rather than "41 Geo. III"). Acts of the last session of the Parliament of Great Britain and the first session of the Parliament of the United Kingdom are both cited as "41 Geo. 3". Acts passed from 1963 onwards are simply cited by calendar year and chapter number.

All modern acts have a short title, e.g. the Local Government Act 2003. Some earlier acts also have a short title given to them by later acts, such as by the Short Titles Act 1896.

== 6 Geo. 4 ==
The sixth session of the 7th Parliament of the United Kingdom, which met from 3 February 1825 until 6 July 1825.

This session was also traditionally cited as 6 G. 4.

=== Public general acts ===
Short title	Citation	Royal assent
Long title
Supply Act 1825 (repealed)	6 Geo. 4. c. 1	4 March 1825
An Act for granting and applying certain Sums of Money for the Service of the Year One thousand eight hundred and twenty five. (Repealed by Statute Law Revision Act 1873 (36 & 37 Vict. c. 91))
Exchequer Bills Act 1825 (repealed)	6 Geo. 4. c. 2	4 March 1825
An Act for raising the Sum of Twenty Millions by Exchequer Bills, for the Service of the Year One thousand eight hundred and twenty five. (Repealed by Statute Law Revision Act 1873 (36 & 37 Vict. c. 91))
Indemnity Act 1825 (repealed)	6 Geo. 4. c. 3	9 March 1825
An Act to indemnify such Persons in the United Kingdom as have omitted to qualify themselves for Offices and Employments, and for extending the Time limited for those Purposes respectively. (Repealed by Promissory Oaths Act 1871 (34 & 35 Vict. c. 48))
Unlawful Societies (Ireland) Act 1825 (repealed)	6 Geo. 4. c. 4	9 March 1825
An Act to amend certain Acts relating to unlawful Societies in Ireland. (Repealed by Statute Law Revision Act 1873 (36 & 37 Vict. c. 91))
Mutiny Act 1825 (repealed)	6 Geo. 4. c. 5	23 March 1825
An Act for punishing Mutiny and Desertion; and for the better Payment of the Army and their Quarters. (Repealed by Statute Law Revision Act 1873 (36 & 37 Vict. c. 91))
Marine Mutiny Act 1825 (repealed)	6 Geo. 4. c. 6	23 March 1825
An Act for the regulating of His Majesty's Royal Marine Forces while on Shore. (Repealed by Statute Law Revision Act 1873 (36 & 37 Vict. c. 91))
House Tax Act 1825 (repealed)	6 Geo. 4. c. 7	23 March 1825
An Act for the further Repeal of certain Duties of Assessed Taxes, and for granting Relief in the Cases therein mentioned. (Repealed by Finance Act 1924 (14 & 15 Geo. 5. c. 21))
Glebe Exchange Act 1825 (repealed)	6 Geo. 4. c. 8	23 March 1825
An Act to amend and render more effectual an Act passed in the Fifty fifth Year of the Reign of His late Majesty, (Note: Glebe Exchange Act 1815 (55 Geo. 3. c. 147)) for enabling Spiritual Persons to exchange their Parsonage Houses or Glebe Lands; and for other Purposes therein mentioned. (Repealed for Ireland by Church of Ireland Acts Repeal Act 1851 (14 & 15 Vict. c. 71) and for England and Wales and Scotland by Endowments and Glebe Measure 1976 (No. 4))
Duties on Offices Act 1825 (repealed)	6 Geo. 4. c. 9	24 March 1825
An Act for continuing to His Majesty for One Year certain Duties on Personal Estates, Offices and Pensions in England; and also for granting certain Duties on Sugar imported; for the Service of the Year One thousand eight hundred and twenty five. (Repealed by Statute Law Revision Act 1958 (6 & 7 Eliz. 2. c. 46))
Courts of Justice Inquiry (Ireland) Act 1825 (repealed)	6 Geo. 4. c. 10	31 March 1825
An Act to facilitate the Proceedings before the Commissioners of Inquiry relating to Courts of Justice in Ireland. (Repealed by Statute Law Revision Act 1873 (36 & 37 Vict. c. 91))
Payment of Creditors (Scotland) Act 1825 (repealed)	6 Geo. 4. c. 11	31 March 1825
An Act to continue, until the Twenty fifth Day of July One thousand eight hundred and twenty six, an Act passed in the Fifty fourth Year of the Reign of His late Majesty, (Note: Payment of Creditors (Scotland) Act 1814 (54 Geo. 3. c. 137)) for rendering the Payment of Creditors more equal and expeditious in Scotland. (Repealed by Statute Law Revision Act 1873 (36 & 37 Vict. c. 91))
Weights and Measures Act 1825 (repealed)	6 Geo. 4. c. 12	31 March 1825
An Act to prolong the Time of the Commencement of an Act of the last Session of Parliament, (Note: Weights and Measures Act 1824 (5 Geo. 4. c. 74)) for ascertaining and establishing Uniformity of Weights and Measures and to amend the said Act. (Repealed by Weights and Measures Act 1878 (41 & 42 Vict. c. 49))
Wine, etc., Duties Act 1825 (repealed)	6 Geo. 4. c. 13	31 March 1825
An Act to reduce the Duties on Wine, Coffee and Hemp, imported into the United Kingdom. (Repealed by Customs Act 1826 (7 Geo. 4. c. 48))
Supply (No. 2) Act 1825 (repealed)	6 Geo. 4. c. 14	31 March 1825
An Act for applying the Sum of Ten millions five hundred thousand Pounds out of the Consolidated Fund, for the Service of the Year One thousand eight hundred and twenty five. (Repealed by Statute Law Revision Act 1873 (36 & 37 Vict. c. 91))
Caledonian Canal Act 1825	6 Geo. 4. c. 15	31 March 1825
An Act to explain and amend Two Acts passed in the Forty third (Note: Caledonian Canal Act 1803 (43 Geo. 3. c. 102)) and Forty fourth (Note: Caledonian Canal Act 1804 (44 Geo. 3. c. 62)) Years of the Reign of His late Majesty King George the Third, for making and maintaining an Inland Navigation, commonly called The Caledonian Canal, by establishing further Checks upon the Expenditure of Public Money for that Purpose, in certain Cases.
Bankruptcy Act 1825 or the Bankrupt Act 1825 or the Bankrupts Act 1825 or the Bankrupts (England) Act 1825 (repealed)	6 Geo. 4. c. 16	2 May 1825
An Act to amend the Laws relating to Bankrupts. (Repealed by Bankrupt Law Consolidation Act 1849 (12 & 13 Vict. c. 106))
Crown Lands Act 1825 (repealed)	6 Geo. 4. c. 17	2 May 1825
An Act to extend the Provisions of an Act of the Fifty ninth Year of His late Majesty, (Note: Crown Land Act 1819 (59 Geo. 3. c. 94)) concerning the Disposition of certain Real and Personal Property of His Majesty, His Heirs and Successors. (Repealed by Crown Estate Act 1961 (9 & 10 Eliz. 2. c. 55))
Navy Pay Act 1825 (repealed)	6 Geo. 4. c. 18	2 May 1825
An Act to make further Provision for the Payment of the Crews of His Majesty's Ships and Vessels. (Repealed by Pay of the Navy Act 1830 (11 Geo. 4 & 1 Will. 4. c. 20))
Threatening Letters Act 1825 (repealed)	6 Geo. 4. c. 19	2 May 1825
An Act for the Amendment of the Law as to the Offence of sending threatening Letters. (Repealed by Statute Law Revision Act 1861 (24 & 25 Vict. c. 101))
Quartering of Soldiers Act 1825 (repealed)	6 Geo. 4. c. 20	2 May 1825
An Act for fixing, until the Twenty fifth Day of March One thousand eight hundred and twenty six, the Rates of Subsistence to be paid to Innkeepers and others on quartering Soldiers. (Repealed by Statute Law Revision Act 1873 (36 & 37 Vict. c. 91))
Justice of the Peace, Metropolis Act 1825 (repealed)	6 Geo. 4. c. 21	20 May 1825
An Act to amend an Act (Note: Police Magistrates, Metropolis Act 1822 (3 Geo. 4. c. 55)) for the more effectual Administration of the Office of Justice of the Peace in and near the Metropolis. (Repealed by Police Magistrates, Metropolis Act 1833 (3 & 4 Will. 4. c. 19))
Jurors (Scotland) Act 1825	6 Geo. 4. c. 22	20 May 1825
An Act to regulate the Qualification and the Manner of enrolling Jurors in Scotland, and of choosing Jurors on Criminal Trials there; and to unite Counties for the Purposes of Trial in Cases of High Treason in Scotland.
Sheriff Courts (Scotland) Act 1825 (repealed)	6 Geo. 4. c. 23	20 May 1825
An Act for the better Regulation of the Sheriff and Stewart and Burgh Courts of Scotland. (Repealed by Statute Law (Repeals) Act 1986 (c. 12))
Small Debts (Scotland) Act 1825 (repealed)	6 Geo. 4. c. 24	20 May 1825
An Act for the more easy Recovery of Small Debts in the Sheriff Courts in Scotland. (Repealed by Statute Law Revision Act 1873 (36 & 37 Vict. c. 91))
Criminal Law Act 1825 (repealed)	6 Geo. 4. c. 25	20 May 1825
An Act for defining the Rights of Capital Convicts who receive Pardon, and of Convicts after having been punished for Clergyable Felonies; for placing Clerks in Orders on the same Footing with other Persons, as to Felonies; and for limiting the Effect of the Benefit of Clergy. (Repealed by Statute Law Revision Act 1873 (36 & 37 Vict. c. 91))
Royal Naval Asylum, etc. Act 1825 (repealed)	6 Geo. 4. c. 26	10 June 1825
An Act for the Consolidation of the Royal Naval Asylum with the Royal Hospital for Seamen at Greenwich in the County of Kent. (Repealed by Greenwich Hospital Outpensions, etc. Act 1829 (10 Geo. 4. c. 26))
Relief to Chelsea, etc., Pensioners Act 1825 (repealed)	6 Geo. 4. c. 27	10 June 1825
An Act for extending to Scotland certain Provisions of an Act (Note: Poor Relief Act 1819 (59 Geo. 3. c. 12)) for the Relief of the Poor, in so far as the same relate to Parochial Relief to Chelsea and other Pensioners. (Repealed by Pensions Act 1839 (2 & 3 Vict. c. 51))
Postage Act 1825 (repealed)	6 Geo. 4. c. 28	10 June 1825
An Act for granting Rates of Postage for the Conveyance of Letters and Packets between Great Britain and Ireland, by way of Liverpool. (Repealed by Post Office (Repeal of Laws) Act 1837 (7 Will. 4 & 1 Vict. c. 32))
Importation Act 1825 (repealed)	6 Geo. 4. c. 29	10 June 1825
An Act to repeal an Act made in the Second Year of the Reign of King William and Queen Mary, (Note: Importation Act 1689 (2 Will. & Mar. c. 9)) for the discouraging the Importation of Thrown Silk. (Repealed by Statute Law Revision Act 1873 (36 & 37 Vict. c. 91))
Court of Chancery (Ireland) Officers Act 1825 (repealed)	6 Geo. 4. c. 30	10 June 1825
An Act to amend an Act of the Fourth Year of His present Majesty's Reign, (Note: Court of Chancery (Ireland) Act 1823 (4 Geo. 4. c. 61)) for the better Administration of Justice in the Court of Chancery in Ireland. (Repealed by Statute Law Revision Act 1891 (54 & 55 Vict. c. 67))
Militia Pay Act 1825 (repealed)	6 Geo. 4. c. 31	10 June 1825
An Act to defray the Charge of the Pay, Clothing and contingent and other Expences of the Disembodied Militia in Great Britain and Ireland; and to grant Allowances in certain Cases to Subaltern Officers, Adjutants, Quartermasters, Surgeons Assistant, Surgeons, Surgeons Mates, and Serjeant Majors of Militia, until the Twenty fifth Day of March One thousand eight hundred and twenty six. (Repealed by Statute Law Revision Act 1873 (36 & 37 Vict. c. 91))
Land Tax Act 1825 (repealed)	6 Geo. 4. c. 32	10 June 1825
An Act to provide for the Application of Monies arising in certain Cases of Assessments for Land Tax in Great Britain. (Repealed by Taxes Management Act 1880 (43 & 44 Vict. c. 19))
Dissolution of Levant Company Act 1825 (repealed)	6 Geo. 4. c. 33	10 June 1825
An Act to repeal certain Acts relating to the Governor and Company of Merchants of England trading to the Levant Seas, and the Duties payable to them; and to authorize the Transfer and Disposal of the Possessions and Property of the said Governor and Company, for the Public Service. (Repealed by Statute Law Revision Act 1873 (36 & 37 Vict. c. 91))
Duke of Atholl's Rights, Isle of Man Act 1825 (repealed)	6 Geo. 4. c. 34	10 June 1825
An Act to empower the Commissioners of His Majesty's Treasury to purchase a certain Annuity in respect of Duties of Customs levied in the Isle of Man, and reserved Sovereign Rights in the said Island, belonging to John Duke of Atholl. (Repealed by Statute Law Revision Act 1873 (36 & 37 Vict. c. 91))
Public Works Loans Act 1825 (repealed)	6 Geo. 4. c. 35	10 June 1825
An Act to render more effectual the several Acts for authorizing Advances for carrying on Public Works, so far as relates to Ireland. (Repealed by Public Works Loans Act 1875 (38 & 39 Vict. c. 89))
Pembroke Dock Act 1825	6 Geo. 4. c. 36	10 June 1825
An Act for enabling the Corporation of Pembroke to relinquish and convey to the Commissioners of His Majesty's Navy the Right of letting the Stalls, Sittings and other Conveniences in the Market established in the Town of Pembroke Dock, and the Right to the Rents, Tolls and Fees thereof.
Exciseable Liquors Act 1825 (repealed)	6 Geo. 4. c. 37	10 June 1825
An Act to provide for the future Assimilation of the Duties of Excise upon Sweets or Made Wines, upon Mead and Metheglin, upon Vinegar, and upon Cyder and Perry, in Great Britain and Ireland, and to continue the Duty of Excise on Sweets or Made Wines in Great Britain until the Fifth Day of January One thousand eight hundred and twenty six Jurisdiction of the Commissioners. (Repealed by Statute Law Revision Act 1873 (36 & 37 Vict. c. 91))
Regent Street, etc. Act 1825	6 Geo. 4. c. 38	10 June 1825
An Act for extending the Jurisdiction of the Commissioners acting in Execution of an Act of the Fifth Year of His present Majesty, (Note: Regent's Park, Regent Street, etc. Act 1824 (5 Geo. 4. c. 100)) for paving and regulating the Regent's Park, together with the New Street from thence to Pall Mall; and for other Purposes relating thereto.
Van Diemen's Land Company Act 1825	6 Geo. 4. c. 39	10 June 1825
An Act for granting certain Powers and Authorities to a Company, to be incorporated by Charter, to be called "The Van Diemen's Land Company," for the Cultivation and Improvement of Waste Lands in His Majesty's Island of Van Diemen's Land, and for other Purposes relating thereto.
Mortgages of County Rates Act 1825 (repealed)	6 Geo. 4. c. 40	10 June 1825
An Act to enable Justices of the Peace in England, in certain Cases to borrow Money on Mortgage of the Rate of the County, Riding, or Place, for which such Justices shall be then acting. (Repealed by Prison Act 1865 (28 & 29 Vict. c. 126))
Stamps Act 1825 (repealed)	6 Geo. 4. c. 41	10 June 1825
An Act to repeal the Stamp Duties payable in Great Britain and Ireland upon the Transfer of Property in Ships and Vessels, and upon Bonds and Debentures required to be given in relation to the Duties, Drawbacks and Bounties of Customs or Excise; and to grant other Duties of Stamps on such Bonds and Debentures. (Repealed by Inland Revenue Repeal Act 1870 (33 & 34 Vict. c. 99))
Bankers (Ireland) Act 1825 (repealed)	6 Geo. 4. c. 42	10 June 1825
An Act for the better Regulation of Copartnerships of certain Bankers in Ireland. (Repealed by Statute Law Revision Act 1963 (c. 30))
Impounding of Distresses (Ireland) Act 1825 (repealed)	6 Geo. 4. c. 43	10 June 1825
An Act to amend and render more effectual an Act made in the Tenth Year of the Reign of King Charles the First, (Note: Impounding of Distresses Act 1634 (10 Chas. 1 Sess. 2. c. 25 (I))) for impounding of Distresses in Ireland. (Repealed by Statute Law Revision Act 1873 (36 & 37 Vict. c. 91))
Postage (No. 2) Act 1825 (repealed)	6 Geo. 4. c. 44	22 June 1825
An Act for granting to His Majesty Rates of Postage on the Conveyance of Letters and Packets to and from Columbia and Mexico. (Repealed by Post Office (Repeal of Laws) Act 1837 (7 Will. 4 & 1 Vict. c. 32))
Articles of Clerkship Enrolment Act 1825 (repealed)	6 Geo. 4. c. 45	22 June 1825
An Act to allow until the Fifth Day of July One thousand eight hundred and twenty five, the Enrolment of Articles of Clerkship to Solicitors and Attornies in England, and the making and filing of Affidavits relating thereto, in certain Cases where the same may have been omitted or neglected. (Repealed by Statute Law Revision Act 1873 (36 & 37 Vict. c. 91))
Articled Clerks Act 1825 (repealed)	6 Geo. 4. c. 46	22 June 1825
An Act to prevent Articled Clerks of Attornies and others, in Great Britain, from being prejudiced by the Neglect of such Attornies and others, in omitting to take out their annual Certificates. (Repealed by Statute Law Revision (No. 2) Act 1888 (51 & 52 Vict. c. 57))
Leasing-making (Scotland) Act 1825 (repealed)	6 Geo. 4. c. 47	22 June 1825
An Act for restricting the Punishment of Leasing making, Sedition and Blasphemy, in Scotland. (Repealed by Statute Law (Repeals) Act 1973 (c. 39))
Justices of the Peace Small Debt (Scotland) Act 1825 (repealed)	6 Geo. 4. c. 48	22 June 1825
An Act to alter and amend an Act passed in the Thirty ninth and Fortieth Year of King George the Third, (Note: Small Debts (Scotland) Act 1800 (39 & 40 Geo. 3. c. 46)) for the Recovery of Small Debts in Scotland. (Repealed by District Courts (Scotland) Act 1975 (c. 20))
Piratical Ships Act 1825 (repealed)	6 Geo. 4. c. 49	22 June 1825
An Act for encouraging the Capture or Destruction of Piratical Ships and Vessels. (Repealed by Piracy Act 1850 (13 & 14 Vict. c. 26))
Juries Act 1825 or the County Juries Act 1825	6 Geo. 4. c. 50	22 June 1825
An Act for consolidating and amending the Laws relative to Jurors and Juries.
Assizes (Ireland) Act 1825 (repealed)	6 Geo. 4. c. 51	22 June 1825
An Act for the Amendment of the Laws with respect to Special Juries, and to Trials in Counties of Cities and Towns, and Towns Corporate, in Ireland. (Repealed by Judicature (Northern Ireland) Act 1978 (c. 23))
Presentments for Salaries (Ireland) Act 1825 (repealed)	6 Geo. 4. c. 52	22 June 1825
An Act to amend an Act of the last Session of Parliament, (Note: Salaries of County Officers (Ireland) Act 1824 (5 Geo. 4. c. 93)) for amending former Acts relating to Presentments by Grand Juries for Payment of the Salaries of Treasurers and Public Officers of the several Counties in Ireland. (Repealed by Statute Law Revision Act 1873 (36 & 37 Vict. c. 91))
Lunatics Act 1825 (repealed)	6 Geo. 4. c. 53	22 June 1825
An Act for limiting the Time within which Inquisitions of Lunacy, Idiotcy and Non Compos Mentis, may be traversed, and for making other Regulations in the Proceedings pending a Traverse. (Repealed for England and Wales by Lunacy Regulation Act 1853 (16 & 17 Vict. c. 70) and for Ireland by Lunacy Regulation (Ireland) Act 1871 (34 & 35 Vict. c. 22))
Lunatic Asylums (Ireland) Act 1825 (repealed)	6 Geo. 4. c. 54	22 June 1825
An Act to amend an Act of the First and Second Years of His present Majesty, (Note: Lunacy (Ireland) Act 1821 (1 & 2 Geo. 4. c. 33)) for the Establishment of Asylums for the Lunatic Poor in Ireland. (Repealed by Statute Law Revision (No. 2) Act 1888 (51 & 52 Vict. c. 57))
Court of Exchequer (Ireland) Act 1825 (repealed)	6 Geo. 4. c. 55	22 June 1825
An Act to regulate the Proceedings as to sealing of Writs in the Court of Exchequer in Ireland. (Repealed by Statute Law Revision Act 1873 (36 & 37 Vict. c. 91))
Forgery Act 1825 (repealed)	6 Geo. 4. c. 56	22 June 1825
An Act to amend Two Acts for removing Difficulties in the Conviction of Offenders stealing Property in Mines and from Corporate Bodies. (Repealed by Statute Law Revision Act 1861 (24 & 25 Vict. c. 101))
Poor Relief (Settlement) Act 1825 (repealed)	6 Geo. 4. c. 57	22 June 1825
An Act for the Amendment of the Law respecting the Settlement of the Poor, as far as regards renting Tenements and paying Parochial Taxes. (Repealed by Poor Law Act 1927 (17 & 18 Geo. 5. c. 14))
Duties on Beer, Malt, etc. Act 1825 (repealed)	6 Geo. 4. c. 58	22 June 1825
An Act for providing equivalent Rates of Excise Duties, Allowances and Drawbacks on Beer and Malt, and on Spirits made in Scotland or Ireland, according to the Measure of the new Imperial Standard Gallon. (Repealed by Inland Revenue Act 1880 (43 & 44 Vict. c. 20))
British North America (Seigniorial Rights) Act 1825 (repealed)	6 Geo. 4. c. 59	22 June 1825
An Act to provide for the Extinction of Feudal and Seignioral Rights and Burthens on Lands held à Titre de Fief and à Titre de Cens, in the Province of Lower Canada; and for the gradual Conversion of those Tenures into the Tenure of Free and Common Soccage; and for other Purposes relating to the said Province., (Repealed by Statute Law Revision Act 1959 (7 & 8 Eliz. 2. c. 68))
Exchequer, Equity Side (Ireland) Act 1825 (repealed)	6 Geo. 4. c. 60	22 June 1825
An Act to amend an Act of the Fourth Year of His present Majesty's Reign, (Note: Court of Exchequer (Ireland) Act 1823 (4 Geo. 4. c. 70)) for the better Administration of Justice in the Equity Side of the Court of Exchequer in Ireland. (Repealed by Statute Law Revision Act 1861 (24 & 25 Vict. c. 101))
Army Act 1825 (repealed)	6 Geo. 4. c. 61	22 June 1825
An Act to amend Two Acts; of the Fifty eighth Year of His late Majesty, (Note: Payment of Regimental Debts Act 1818 (58 Geo. 3. c. 73)) for regulating the Payment of Regimental Debts, and the Distribution of the Effects of Officers and Soldiers dying in Service; and the Receipt of Sums due to Soldiers; and of the Fourth Year of His present Majesty, (Note: East India Company's Service Act 1823 (4 Geo. 4. c. 81)) for punishing Mutiny and Desertion of Officers and Soldiers in the Service of the East India Company. (Repealed by Regimental Debts Act 1863 (26 & 27 Vict. c. 57))
Poor Prisoners (Scotland) Act 1825 (repealed)	6 Geo. 4. c. 62	22 June 1825
An Act to amend an Act of the Scottish Parliament, relative to the Aliment of poor Prisoners. (Repealed by Statute Law (Repeals) Act 1978 (c. 45))
Cotton Mills, etc. Act 1825 or the Cotton Mills Regulation Act 1825 or Hobhouse's Act (repealed)	6 Geo. 4. c. 63	22 June 1825
An Act to make further Provisions for the Regulation of Cotton Mills and Factories, and for the better Preservation of the Health of young Persons employed therein. (Repealed by Labour in Cotton Mills Act 1831 (1 & 2 Will. 4. c. 39))
Duty on Wheat Act 1825 (repealed)	6 Geo. 4. c. 64	22 June 1825
An Act to alter for One Year, and until the End of the then next Session of Parliament, the Duty on Wheat the Produce of the British Possessions in North America. (Repealed by Statute Law Revision Act 1873 (36 & 37 Vict. c. 91))
Entry of Warehoused Corn Act 1825 (repealed)	6 Geo. 4. c. 65	22 June 1825
An Act to alter for One Year, and until the End of the then next Session of Parliament, the Duty on Wheat the Produce of the British Possessions in North America. (Repealed by Statute Law Revision Act 1873 (36 & 37 Vict. c. 91))
Trial of Peers (Scotland) Act 1825 (repealed)	6 Geo. 4. c. 66	22 June 1825
An Act for explaining and amending an Act of the Sixth Year of the Reign of Her Majesty Queen Anne, intituled "An Act to make further Provision for electing and summoning Sixteen Peers of Scotland to sit in the House of Peers in the Parliament of Great Britain, and for trying Peers for Offences committed in Scotland, and for the further regulating of Voters in Elections of Members to serve in Parliament," (Note: Scottish Representative Peers Act 1707 (6 Ann. c. 78)) so far as relates to the Trial of Peers for Offences committed in Scotland. (Repealed by Criminal Justice Act 1948 (11 & 12 Geo. 6. c. 58))
Naturalization and Restoration of Blood Act 1825 (repealed)	6 Geo. 4. c. 67	22 June 1825
An Act to alter and amend an Act passed in the Seventh Year of the Reign of His Majesty King James the First, intituled "An Act that all such as are to be naturalized or restored in Blood shall first receive the Sacrament of the Lord's Supper, and the Oath of Allegiance and the Oath of Supremacy." (Note: Naturalisation and Restoration of Blood Act 1609 (7 Jas. 1. c. 2)) (Repealed by Naturalization Act 1870 (33 & 34 Vict. c. 14))
Postage (No. 3) Act 1825 (repealed)	6 Geo. 4. c. 68	22 June 1825
An Act to regulate the Conveyance of printed Votes and Proceedings in Parliament, and printed Newspapers, by Packet Boats between Great Britain and Ireland, and the British Colonies, and also in the United Kingdom. (Repealed by Statute Law Revision Act 1873 (36 & 37 Vict. c. 91))
Transportation Act 1825 (repealed)	6 Geo. 4. c. 69	22 June 1825
An Act for punishing Offences committed by Transports kept to labour in the Colonies; and better regulating the Powers of Justices of the Peace in New South Wales. (Repealed by Statute Law Revision Act 1958 (6 & 7 Eliz. 2. c. 46))
Exchequer Bills (No. 2) Act 1825 (repealed)	6 Geo. 4. c. 70	22 June 1825
An Act for raising the Sum of Ten millions five hundred thousand Pounds by Exchequer Bills, for the Service of the Year One thousand eight hundred and twenty five. (Repealed by Statute Law Revision Act 1873 (36 & 37 Vict. c. 91))
Annuity for Prince George of Cumberland Act 1825 (repealed)	6 Geo. 4. c. 71	22 June 1825
An Act to enable His Majesty to grant an Annual Sum to His Royal Highness Ernest Augustus Duke of Cumberland, for the Purpose of enabling His said Royal Highness to provide for the Support and Education of His Highness Prince George Frederick Alexander Charles Ernest Augustus of Cumberland. (Repealed by Statute Law Revision Act 1873 (36 & 37 Vict. c. 91))
Annuity for Princess Victoria Act 1825 (repealed)	6 Geo. 4. c. 72	22 June 1825
An Act to enable His Majesty to grant an Annual Sum to Her Royal Highness Mary Louisa Victoria Duchess of Kent, for the Purpose of enabling Her said Royal Highness to provide for the Support and Education of Her Highness the Princess Alexandrina Victoria of Kent. (Repealed by Statute Law Revision Act 1873 (36 & 37 Vict. c. 91))
American and West Indian Trade Act 1825 (repealed)	6 Geo. 4. c. 73	27 June 1825
An Act for further regulating the Trade of His Majesty's Possessions in America and the West Indies, and for the warehousing of Goods therein. (Repealed by Customs Act 1826 (7 Geo. 4. c. 48))
Infants, Lunatics, etc. Act 1825 (repealed)	6 Geo. 4. c. 74	27 June 1825
An Act for consolidating and amending the Laws relating to Conveyances and Transfers of Estates and Funds vested in Trustees, who are Infants, Idiots, Lunatics or Trustees of unsound Mind, or who cannot be compelled or refuse to act; and also the Laws relating to Stocks and Securities belonging to Infants, Idiots, Lunatics and Persons of unsound Mind. (Repealed by Transfer of Trust Estates Act 1830 (11 Geo. 4 & 1 Will. 4. c. 60) and Infants' Property Act 1830 (11 Geo. 4 & 1 Will. 4. c. 65))
Canada Company Act 1825 (repealed)	6 Geo. 4. c. 75	27 June 1825
An Act to enable His Majesty to grant to a Company, to be incorporated by Charter, to be called "The Canada Company," certain Lands in the Province of Upper Canada, and to invest the said Company with certain Powers and Privileges, and for other Purposes relating thereto. (Repealed by Statute Law (Repeals) Act 1977 (c. 18))
Duties on Mauritius Act 1825 (repealed)	6 Geo. 4. c. 76	27 June 1825
An Act to extend to the Island of Mauritius the Duties and Regulations which relate to the British Islands in the West Indies. (Repealed by Customs Act 1826 (7 Geo. 4. c. 48))
Buckingham Palace Act 1825 (repealed)	6 Geo. 4. c. 77	27 June 1825
An Act to authorize the Application of Part of the Land Revenue of the Crown for the Repair and Improvement of Buckingham House. (Repealed by Crown Lands Act 1829 (10 Geo. 4. c. 50))
Quarantine Act 1825 (repealed)	6 Geo. 4. c. 78	27 June 1825
An Act to repeal the several Laws relating to the Performance of Quarantine, and to make other Provisions in lieu thereof. (Repealed by Public Health Act 1896 (59 & 60 Vict. c. 19))
Currency Act 1825 (repealed)	6 Geo. 4. c. 79	27 June 1825
An Act to provide for the Assimilation of the Currency and Monies of Account throughout the United Kingdom of Great Britain and Ireland. (Repealed by Coinage Act 1870 (33 & 34 Vict. c. 10))
Duties on Spirits Act 1825 (repealed)	6 Geo. 4. c. 80	27 June 1825
An Act to repeal the Duties payable in respect of Spirits distilled in England, and of Licences for distilling, rectifying or compounding such Spirits, and for the Sale of Spirits, and to impose other Duties in lieu thereof; and to provide other Regulations for the Collection of the said Duties, and for the Sale of Spirits, and for the Warehousing of such Spirits, without Payment of Duty, for Exportation. (Repealed by Statute Law Revision Act 1873 (36 & 37 Vict. c. 91) and Spirits Act 1880 (43 & 44 Vict. c. 24))
Excise Licences Act 1825 (repealed)	6 Geo. 4. c. 81	27 June 1825
An Act to repeal several Duties payable on Excise Licences in Great Britain and Ireland, and to impose other Duties in lieu thereof; and to amend the Laws for granting Excise Licences. (Repealed by Customs and Excise Act 1952 (15 & 16 Geo. 6 & 1 Eliz. 2. c. 44))
Chief Justice's Pension Act 1825 (repealed)	6 Geo. 4. c. 82	5 July 1825
An Act to abolish the Sale of Offices in the Court of King's Bench in England, to make Provision for the Lord Chief Justice of the said Court, and to grant an additional Annuity to the said Lord Chief Justice on Resignation of his Office. (Repealed by Supreme Court of Judicature (Consolidation) Act 1925 (15 & 16 Geo. 5. c. 49))
Court of Common Pleas Act 1825 (repealed)	6 Geo. 4. c. 83	5 July 1825
An Act to abolish the Sale of Offices in the Court of Common Pleas in England, to make Provision for the Lord Chief Justice of the said Court, and to grant an additional Annuity to the said Lord Chief Justice on Resignation of his Office. (Repealed by Statute Law Revision (No. 2) Act 1888 (51 & 52 Vict. c. 57))
Judges' Pensions Act 1825 (repealed)	6 Geo. 4. c. 84	5 July 1825
An Act to provide for the augmenting the Salaries of the Master of the Rolls and the Vice Chancellor of England, the Chief Baron of the Court of Exchequer, and the Puisne Judges and Barons of the Courts in Westminster Hall; and to enable His Majesty to grant an Annuity to such Vice Chancellor, and additional Annuities to such Master of the Rolls, Chief Baron and Puisne Judges and Barons, on their Resignation of their respective Offices. (Repealed by Supreme Court of Judicature (Consolidation) Act 1925 (15 & 16 Geo. 5. c. 49))
Indian Salaries and Pensions Act 1825 (repealed)	6 Geo. 4. c. 85	5 July 1825
An Act for further regulating the Payment of the Salaries and Pensions to the Judges of His Majesty's Courts in India, and the Bishop of Calcutta; for authorizing the Transportation of Offenders from the Island of Saint Helena; and for more effectually providing for the Administration of Justice in Singapore and Malacca, and certain Colonies on the Coast of Coromandel. (Repealed by Government of India Act 1915 (5 & 6 Geo. 5. c. 61))
Courts of Justice (Scotland) Act 1825 (repealed)	6 Geo. 4. c. 86	5 July 1825
An Act to provide for the Erection of certain Courts and Offices of Justice in Scotland. (Repealed by Statute Law (Repeals) Act 1989 (c. 43))
Consular Advances Act 1825 (repealed)	6 Geo. 4. c. 87	5 July 1825
An Act to regulate the Payment of Salaries and Allowances to British Consuls at Foreign Ports, and the Disbursements at such Ports for certain public Purposes. (Repealed by Statute Law (Repeals) Act 1973 (c. 39))
West Indian Bishops, etc. Act 1825 (repealed)	6 Geo. 4. c. 88	5 July 1825
An Act to make Provision for the Salaries of certain Bishops and other Ecclesiastical Dignitaries and Ministers, in the Diocese of Jamaica, and in the Diocese of Barbadoes and the Leeward Islands; and to enable His Majesty to grant Annuities to such Bishops upon the Resignation of their Offices. (Repealed by Statute Law Revision Act 1874 (37 & 38 Vict. c. 35))
Purchase of Common Law Offices Act 1825 (repealed)	6 Geo. 4. c. 89	5 July 1825
An Act to authorize the Purchase of the Office of Receiver and Comptroller of the Seal of the Court of King's Bench and Common Pleas, and of Custos Brevium of the Court of Common Pleas. (Repealed by Statute Law Revision Act 1873 (36 & 37 Vict. c. 91))
Civil Service Pensions Act 1825 (repealed)	6 Geo. 4. c. 90	5 July 1825
An Act to amend an Act of the Fifty seventh Year of His late Majesty, (Note: Civil Service Pensions Act 1817 (57 Geo. 3. c. 65)) for enabling His Majesty to recompense the Services of Persons holding or who have held certain high and efficient Civil Offices. (Repealed by Political Offices Pension Act 1869 (32 & 33 Vict. c. 60))
Bubble Companies, etc. Act 1825 (repealed)	6 Geo. 4. c. 91	5 July 1825
An Act to repeal so much of an Act passed in the Sixth Year of His late Majesty King George the First, (Note: Royal Exchange and London Assurance Corporation Act 1719 (6 Geo. 1. c. 18)) as relates to the restraining several extravagant and unwarrantable Practices in the said Act mentioned; and for conferring additional Powers upon His Majesty, with respect to the granting of Charters of Incorporation to trading and other Companies. (Repealed by Statute Law Revision Act 1873 (36 & 37 Vict. c. 91))
Marriages Confirmation Act 1825 (repealed)	6 Geo. 4. c. 92	5 July 1825
An Act to render valid Marriages solemnized in certain Churches and Public Chapels in which Banns have not usually been published. (Repealed by Statute Law (Repeals) Act 1977 (c. 18))
Decrees, etc., Made at Rolls Court Act 1825 (repealed)	6 Geo. 4. c. 93	5 July 1825
An Act to render valid certain Decrees and Orders at the Rolls Court. (Repealed by Statute Law Revision Act 1873 (36 & 37 Vict. c. 91))
Factor Act 1825 (repealed)	6 Geo. 4. c. 94	5 July 1825
An Act to alter and amend an Act (Note: Factor Act 1823 (4 Geo. 4. c. 83)) for the better Protection of the Property of Merchants and others, who may enter into Contracts or Agreements in relation to Goods, Wares or Merchandize intrusted to Factors or Agents. (Repealed for India by Criminal Law (India) Act 1828 (9 Geo. 4. c. 74), for England and Wales and Ireland by Factors Act 1889 (52 & 53 Vict. c. 45) and for Scotland by Factors (Scotland) Act 1890 (53 & 54 Vict. c. 40))
Sergeants at Law Act 1825 (repealed)	6 Geo. 4. c. 95	5 July 1825
An Act to enable such Persons as His Majesty may be pleased to call to the Degree of a Serjeant at Law, to take upon themselves that Office in Vacation. (Repealed by Civil Procedure Acts Repeal Act 1879 (42 & 43 Vict. c. 59))
Writs of Error Act 1825 (repealed)	6 Geo. 4. c. 96	5 July 1825
An Act for preventing frivolous Writs of Error. (Repealed by Statute Law Revision Act 1861 (24 & 25 Vict. c. 101))
Universities Act 1825	6 Geo. 4. c. 97	5 July 1825
An Act for the better Preservation of the Peace and good Order in the Universities of England.
Tokens Act 1825 (repealed)	6 Geo. 4. c. 98	5 July 1825
An Act to prevent the further Circulation of Tokens issued by the Governor and Company of the Bank of Ireland, for the Convenience of the Public, and for defraying the Expence of exchanging such Tokens. (Repealed by Coinage Act 1870 (33 & 34 Vict. c. 10))
Manors, etc. (Ireland) Act 1825 (repealed)	6 Geo. 4. c. 99	5 July 1825
An Act to repeal an Act of the last Session of Parliament (Note: Boundaries, etc., of Counties (Ireland) Act 1824 (5 Geo. 4. c. 112)) relative to the forming Tables of Manors, Parishes and Townlands in Ireland, and to make Provision for ascertaining the Boundaries of the same. (Repealed by Statute Law Revision Act 1873 (36 & 37 Vict. c. 91))
Holyhead Road Act 1825 (repealed)	6 Geo. 4. c. 100	5 July 1825
An Act to extend the Powers of an Act (Note: Holyhead Road Act 1823 (4 Geo. 4. c. 74)) for vesting in Commissioners the Bridges building over the Menai Straits and the River Conway, and the Harbours of Howth and Holyhead, and the Road from Dublin to Howth; and for the further Improvement of the Road from London to Holyhead. (Repealed by London and Holyhead and Liverpool Roads Act 1827 (7 & 8 Geo. 4. c. 35) and Statute Law (Repeals) Act 2013 (c. 2))
Repair of Roads and Bridges (Ireland) Act 1825 (repealed)	6 Geo. 4. c. 101	5 July 1825
An Act to provide for the repairing, maintaining and keeping in Repair certain Roads and Bridges in Ireland. (Repealed by Statute Law Revision Act 1873 (36 & 37 Vict. c. 91))
Deserted Children (Ireland) Act 1825 (repealed)	6 Geo. 4. c. 102	5 July 1825
An Act to amend the Laws respecting deserted Children in Ireland. (Repealed by Statute Law Revision Act 1873 (36 & 37 Vict. c. 91))
Purchase for Naval Yard at Leith, etc. Act 1825 (repealed)	6 Geo. 4. c. 103	5 July 1825
An Act to enable the principal Officers and Commissioners of His Majesty's Navy to acquire certain Portions of the Docks and Shore Ground at Leith for a Naval Yard, and to enable the Commissioners of the Treasury to advance a certain Sum of Money on the Security of the Docks and of the Harbour of Leith. (Repealed by Statute Law Revision Act 1873 (36 & 37 Vict. c. 91))
Customs Act 1825 (repealed)	6 Geo. 4. c. 104	5 July 1825
An Act to repeal certain Duties of Customs, and to grant other Duties in lieu thereof; to continue, until the Fifth Day of July One thousand eight hundred and twenty six, the Bounties on Refined Sugar; and to alter the Bounty on Cordage. (Repealed by Customs Act 1826 (7 Geo. 4. c. 48))
Customs Law Repeal Act 1825 or the Customs' Laws' Repeal Act 1825 or the Customs Repeal Act 1825 or the Customs Act 1825 (repealed)	6 Geo. 4. c. 105	5 July 1825
An Act to repeal the several Laws relating to the Customs. (Repealed by Statute Law Revision Act 1873 (36 & 37 Vict. c. 91))
Customs, etc. Act 1825 (repealed)	6 Geo. 4. c. 106	5 July 1825
An Act for the Management of the Customs. (Repealed by Customs (Repeal) Act 1833 (3 & 4 Will. 4. c. 50))
Customs, etc. (No. 2) Act 1825 (repealed)	6 Geo. 4. c. 107	5 July 1825
An Act for the general Regulation of the Customs. (Repealed by Customs (Repeal) Act 1833 (3 & 4 Will. 4. c. 50))
Customs, etc. (No. 3) Act 1825 (repealed)	6 Geo. 4. c. 108	5 July 1825
An Act for the Prevention of Smuggling. (Repealed by Customs (Repeal) Act 1833 (3 & 4 Will. 4. c. 50))
Customs, etc. (No. 4) Act 1825 (repealed)	6 Geo. 4. c. 109	5 July 1825
An Act for the Encouragement of British Shipping and Navigation. (Repealed by Customs (Repeal) Act 1833 (3 & 4 Will. 4. c. 50))
Customs, etc. (No. 5) Act 1825 (repealed)	6 Geo. 4. c. 110	5 July 1825
An Act for the registering of British Vessels. (Repealed by Customs (Repeal) Act 1833 (3 & 4 Will. 4. c. 50))
Customs, etc. (No. 6) Act 1825 (repealed)	6 Geo. 4. c. 111	5 July 1825
An Act for granting Duties of Customs. (Repealed by Customs (Repeal) Act 1833 (3 & 4 Will. 4. c. 50))
Customs, etc. (No. 7) Act 1825 (repealed)	6 Geo. 4. c. 112	5 July 1825
An Act for the warehousing of Goods. (Repealed by Customs (Repeal) Act 1833 (3 & 4 Will. 4. c. 50))
Customs, etc. (No. 8) Act 1825 (repealed)	6 Geo. 4. c. 113	5 July 1825
An Act to grant certain Bounties and Allowances of Customs. (Repealed by Customs (Repeal) Act 1833 (3 & 4 Will. 4. c. 50))
Customs, etc. (No. 9) Act 1825 (repealed)	6 Geo. 4. c. 114	5 July 1825
An Act to regulate the Trade of the British Possessions abroad. (Repealed by Customs (Repeal) Act 1833 (3 & 4 Will. 4. c. 50))
Customs, etc. (No. 10) Act 1825 (repealed)	6 Geo. 4. c. 115	5 July 1825
An Act for regulating the Trade of the Isle of Man. (Repealed by Customs (Repeal) Act 1833 (3 & 4 Will. 4. c. 50))
Passenger Vessels Act 1825 (repealed)	6 Geo. 4. c. 116	5 July 1825
An Act for regulating Vessels carrying Passengers to Foreign Parts. (Repealed by Passenger Vessels Act 1827 (7 & 8 Geo. 4. c. 19))
Duties on Glass, etc. Act 1825 (repealed)	6 Geo. 4. c. 117	5 July 1825
An Act to repeal the Excise Duties and Drawbacks on Flint Glass in Great Britain, and to impose other Duties and another Drawback in lieu thereof, throughout the United Kingdom; and to continue the Jurisdiction and Powers for recovering Penalties under Customs and Excise Laws in Ireland, until further Provision can be made. (Repealed by Statute Law Revision Act 1873 (36 & 37 Vict. c. 91))
Duties on Plate, etc. Act 1825 (repealed)	6 Geo. 4. c. 118	5 July 1825
An Act to transfer the Collection and Management of the Duties on Gold and Silver Plate in Ireland, and also on certain Licences in Great Britain and Ireland respectively, from the Commissioners of Excise to the Commissioners of Stamps in Great Britain and Ireland respectively; and to repeal so much of an Act (Note: Manufacture of Scorched Corn, etc. Act 1822 (3 Geo. 4. c. 53)) as requires Excise Stamps to be affixed on Papers and Pots containing Cocoa Paste. (Repealed by Statute Law Revision Act 1874 (37 & 38 Vict. c. 35))
Newspaper Stamps Act 1825 (repealed)	6 Geo. 4. c. 119	5 July 1825
An Act to allow Newspapers to be printed upon Paper of a larger Size than is now allowed; and to reduce the Stamp Duties now payable upon Supplements to Newspapers and other Papers in Great Britain. (Repealed by Stamp Duties on Newspapers Act 1836 (6 & 7 Will. 4. c. 76))
Court of Session Act 1825	6 Geo. 4. c. 120	5 July 1825
An Act for the better regulating of the Forms of Process in the Courts of Law in Scotland.
Insolvent Debtors Act 1825 (repealed)	6 Geo. 4. c. 121	5 July 1825
An Act to enable the Insolvent Debtors' Court to dispense, until the end of the next Session of Parliament, with the Necessity of Prisoners residing within the Walls in certain Cases. (Repealed by Statute Law Revision Act 1873 (36 & 37 Vict. c. 91))
Linen Manufacturers (Ireland) Act 1825 (repealed)	6 Geo. 4. c. 122	5 July 1825
An Act for the better Regulation of the Linen and Hempen Manufactures of Ireland. (Repealed by Linen and Hempen Manufacturers Act 1828 (9 Geo. 4. c. 62))
Costs on Private Bills, etc. Act 1825 (repealed)	6 Geo. 4. c. 123	5 July 1825
An Act to establish a Taxation of Costs on Private Bills in the House of Commons; and to prohibit the Sale of certain Offices under the Sergeant at Arms attending the House of Commons. (Repealed by House of Commons Costs Taxation Act 1847 (10 & 11 Vict. c. 69))
Marylebone District Rectories Act 1825 (repealed)	6 Geo. 4. c. 124	5 July 1825
An Act for making the Four Districts in the Parish of Saint Mary-le-bone, in the County of Middlesex, District Rectories for certain Purposes. (Repealed by S.R. & O. 1901/172)
Pilotage Act 1825 (repealed)	6 Geo. 4. c. 125	5 July 1825
An Act for the Amendment of the Law respecting Pilots and Pilotage; and also for the better Preservation of Floating Lights, Buoys and Beacons. (Repealed by Merchant Shipping Repeal Act 1854 (17 & 18 Vict. c. 120))
Malicious Wounding, etc. (Scotland) Act 1825 (repealed)	6 Geo. 4. c. 126	5 July 1825
An Act to make Provision in Scotland for the further Prevention of malicious shooting, and attempting to discharge loaded Fire Arms, stabbing, cutting, wounding, poisoning, maiming, disfiguring and disabling His Majesty's Subjects. (Repealed by Criminal Law (Scotland) Act 1829 (10 Geo. 4. c. 38))
Protection of Property in Orchards, etc. Act 1825 (repealed)	6 Geo. 4. c. 127	5 July 1825
An Act for making further Provision by Law for the Protection of Property in Orchards, Gardens and Nursery Grounds. (Repealed by Stealing from Gardens Act 1826 (7 Geo. 4. c. 69))
Dublin Streets Act 1825	6 Geo. 4. c. 128	5 July 1825
An Act to enable the Commissioners of His Majesty's Treasury to advance out of the Consolidated Fund certain Sums for the Payment of Debts due from the Commissioners of Wide Streets, and for the erecting a Corn Exchange in the City of Dublin; and to repeal certain Duties on Licences relating to Cards and Clubs in the City of Dublin.
Combinations of Workmen Act 1825 (repealed)	6 Geo. 4. c. 129	6 July 1825
An Act to repeal the Laws relating to the Combination of Workmen, and to make other Provisions in lieu thereof. (Repealed by Criminal Law Amendment Act 1871 (34 & 35 Vict. c. 32))
Church Rates (Ireland) Act 1825 (repealed)	6 Geo. 4. c. 130	6 July 1825
An Act to alter and amend the Law as to Church Rates in Ireland, and to regulate the same. (Repealed by Church Rates (Ireland) Act 1826 (7 Geo. 4. c. 72))
Co-partnerships (Scotland) Act 1825 (repealed)	6 Geo. 4. c. 131	6 July 1825
An Act to regulate the Mode in which certain Societies or Copartnerships in Scotland may sue and be sued. (Repealed by Statute Law Revision Act 1873 (36 & 37 Vict. c. 91))
Salcey Forest Act 1825 (repealed)	6 Geo. 4. c. 132	6 July 1825
An Act for dividing, allotting and inclosing the Forest of Salcey, in the Counties of Northampton and Buckingham, and of certain Lands in the Parish of Hartwell in the said County of Northampton. (Repealed by Wild Creatures and Forest Laws Act 1971 (c. 47))
Apothecaries Amendment Act 1825 (repealed)	6 Geo. 4. c. 133	6 July 1825
An act to amend and explain an Act of the Fifty fifth Year of His late Majesty, (Note: Apothecaries Act 1815 (55 Geo. 3. c. 194)) for better regulating the Practice of Apothecaries throughout England and Wales. (Repealed by Statute Law Revision Act 1873 (36 & 37 Vict. c. 91))
Appropriation Act 1825 (repealed)	6 Geo. 4. c. 134	6 July 1825
An Act for applying the Surplus of the Grants of the Year One thousand eight hundred and twenty four to the Service of the Year One thousand eight hundred and twenty five; and for further appropriating the Supplies granted in this Session of Parliament. (Repealed by Statute Law Revision Act 1873 (36 & 37 Vict. c. 91))

=== Local acts ===
Short title	Citation	Royal assent
Long title
Road from Derby to Uttoxeter Act 1825	6 Geo. 4. c. i	9 March 1825
An Act for more effectually repairing and otherwise improving the Road from the Town of Derby to the Town of Uttoxeter in the County of Stafford, and for making and maintaining a new Branch of Road to communicate with the said Road.
Penwortham Bridge Road (Lancashire) Act 1825	6 Geo. 4. c. ii	23 March 1825
An Act for repairing and maintaining the Road from Penwortham Bridge to the Boundary between the Townships of Wrightington and Shevington, and the Road from Lydiate Lane End to a Bridge called Little Hanging Bridge, all in the County of Lancaster.
Road from Wellington Bridge Road to Tong Lane End (Yorkshire) Act 1825 (repealed)	6 Geo. 4. c. iii	23 March 1825
An Act for making and maintaining a Turnpike Road from the Turnpike Road called Wellington Bridge Road, near the Town of Leeds, in the West Riding of the County of York, to the Turnpike Road leading from Wakefield to Bradford, in the said Riding, near a certain Place called Tong Lane End, in the Lordship or Liberty of Tong, in the Parish of Birstal, in the Riding aforesaid, with several Branch Roads therefrom. (Repealed by Road from Wellington Bridge Road to Tong Lane End (Yorkshire) Act 1835 (5 & 6 Will. 4. c. xxxvi))
Grigg's Quay, Hayle Bridge and Phillack Road (Cornwall) Act 1825 (repealed)	6 Geo. 4. c. iv	23 March 1825
An Act for building a Bridge and making a Causeway and Turnpike Road from or near Grigg's Quay, in the Parish of Uny Lelant, over Hayle River and Sands, in the Parish of Saint Erth, to Carnsew Quay, through Hayle Foundery, in the said Parish of Saint Erth, and Pen Poll in the Parish of Phillack, all in the County of Cornwall. (Repealed by Griggs Quay and Penzance Turnpike Road Act 1837 (7 Will. 4 & 1 Vict. c. ii))
Ardwick Improvement Act 1825 (repealed)	6 Geo. 4. c. v	23 March 1825
An Act for lighting, cleansing, watching and improving the Township of Ardwick in the County of Lancaster, and for regulating the Police thereof. (Repealed by Manchester General Improvement Act 1851 (14 & 15 Vict. c. cxix))
Stroud Improvement Act 1825	6 Geo. 4. c. vi	23 March 1825
An Act for paving lighting watching cleansing regulating and improving the Town of Stroud, in the County of Gloucester.
Gatherley Moor and Staindrop, and Smallways and Winston Roads Act 1825	6 Geo. 4. c. vii	23 March 1825
An Act for more effectually repairing the Roads from the Turnpike Road upon Gatherley Moor, in the County of York, to Staindrop, in the County of Durham, and from the said Turnpike Road near Smallways, across the River Tees, to Winston, in the said County of Durham.
Bridgnorth (Salop.) and Shiffnall Road Act 1825 (repealed)	6 Geo. 4. c. viii	23 March 1825
An Act for repairing the Road leading from Bridgnorth to Shiffnall, otherwise Idsall, in the County of Salop. (Repealed by Statute Law (Repeals) Act 2013 (c. 2))
Boroughbridge, Catterick and Piersbridge Road Act 1825	6 Geo. 4. c. ix	23 March 1825
An Act for enlarging the Term and Powers of several Acts passed for repairing the High Road from Boroughbridge in the County of York, to Catterick in the same County, and from thence to Piersbridge on the River Tees.
Hinckley, Nuneaton and Coventry Road Act 1825	6 Geo. 4. c. x	23 March 1825
An Act for repairing the Road from Hinckley, in the County of Leicester, to Nuneaton, in the County of Warwick, and from thence to Bishop's Gate, in the City of Coventry.
Midhurst and Sheet Bridge Turnpike Road Act 1825	6 Geo. 4. c. xi	23 March 1825
An Act for making and maintaining a Turnpike Road from Midhurst, in the County of Sussex, to the London and Portsmouth Turnpike Road, between the Fifty-second and Fifty-third Milestones near Sheet Bridge, in the County of Southampton.
Road from Kirkby Stephen to Sedburgh and Kirkby Kendal Act 1825 (repealed)	6 Geo. 4. c. xii	23 March 1825
An Act for making and maintaining a Turnpike Road from Kirkby Stephen, in the County of Westmorland, into the Sedberg and Kirkby Kendal Turnpike Road, and out of and from the same Turnpike Road to Hawes in the North Riding of the County of York; and a new Branch from Hawes aforesaid to the Village of Gayle, in the Township of Hawes. (Repealed by Kirkby Stephen and Hawes Turnpike Road Act 1852 (15 & 16 Vict. c. lxxxix))
Stockton and Barnard Castle Road Act 1825	6 Geo. 4. c. xiii	23 March 1825
An Act for repairing the Road from Stockton to Barnard Castle, in the County of Durham.
Winchester and Petersfield Turnpike Road Act 1825 (repealed)	6 Geo. 4. c. xiv	23 March 1825
An Act for making and maintaining a Turnpike Road from the City of Winchester to the Town of Petersfield, in the County of Southampton. (Repealed by Winchester and Petersfield Turnpike Road Act 1854 (17 & 18 Vict. c. cxxiii))
Roads from Smalley Common and from Ilkeston (Derbyshire, Nottinghamshire) Act 1825 (repealed)	6 Geo. 4. c. xv	24 March 1825
An Act for more effectually repairing the Road from Bramcote Odd House, in the County of Nottingham, to the Cross Post upon Smalley Common, in the County of Derby, and from Ilkeston to Heanor, in the said County of Derby, and from Trowell, in the said County of Nottingham, to the Town of Nottingham. (Repealed by Annual Turnpike Acts Continuance Act 1874 (37 & 38 Vict. c. 95))
Whiteburn and Choicelee Road (Berwick) Act 1825	6 Geo. 4. c. xvi	24 March 1825
An Act for repairing and maintaining the Road from Whiteburn, upon the Turnpike Road from Edinburgh to Greenlaw, passing through Thornydike and Westruther to Choicelee, upon the Turnpike Road from Greenlaw to Dunse, all in the County of Berwick.
Calder and Hebble Navigation Act 1825	6 Geo. 4. c. xvii	31 March 1825
An Act to enable the Company of Proprietors of the Calder and Hebble Navigation to make a navigable Cut or Canal from Salterhebble Bridge to Bailey Hall, near to the Town of Halifax, in the West Riding of the County of York; and to amend the Act (Note: Calder and Hebble Navigation Act 1769 (9 Geo. 3. c. 71)) relating to the said Navigation.
Bolton and Leigh Railway Act 1825 (repealed)	6 Geo. 4. c. xviii	31 March 1825
An Act for making and maintaining a Railway or Tram Road from or near the Manchester, Bolton and Bury Canal, in the Parish of Bolton-le-Moors, to or near the Leeds and Liverpool Canal, in the Parish of Leigh, all in the County Palatine of Lancaster. (Repealed by Grand Junction Railway Act 1845 (8 & 9 Vict. c. cxcviii))
Stourbridge Improvement Act 1825	6 Geo. 4. c. xix	31 March 1825
An Act for better lighting, cleansing, watching, paving and otherwise improving the Township of Stourbridge, in the Parish of Oldswinford, in the County of Worcester; for regulating the Market and building a Market Place within and for the said Township; and for removing and preventing Nuisances and Annoyances therein.
Margate Improvement Act 1825 (repealed)	6 Geo. 4. c. xx	31 March 1825
An Act to amend and render more effectual several Acts re lative to the paving, lighting, watching and improving the Town of Margate in the Parish of Saint John the Baptist in the County of Kent; for erecting certain Defences against the Sea for the Protection of the said Town; and for making further Improvements in and about the said Town and Parish. (Repealed by County of Kent Act 1981 (c. xviii))
Stockport Gas Act 1825	6 Geo. 4. c. xxi	31 March 1825
An Act for lighting with Gas the Town of Stockport, in the County Palatine of Chester.
Road from Wigan through Hindley Act 1825	6 Geo. 4. c. xxii	31 March 1825
An Act for amending and maintaining the Road leading from Wigan and commencing at Clarington Brook, and passing over Amberswood Common through Hindley to a Place called Chequer Bent in Westhoughton, all in the County Palatine of Lancaster.
Cainscross and Minchinhampton Turnpike Road Act 1825 (repealed)	6 Geo. 4. c. xxiii	31 March 1825
An Act for making and maintaining a Turnpike Road from Cainscross through Stroud, over Rodborough and Minchinhampton Commons, to the Town of Minchinhampton, with several Branches therefrom, all in the County of Gloucester. (Repealed by Stroud, Cainscross and Minchinhampton Road Act 1855 (18 & 19 Vict. c. cviii))
Road from Grantham to Nottingham Trent Bridge Act 1825	6 Geo. 4. c. xxiv	31 March 1825
An Act for more effectually repairing the Road from Grantham, in the County of Lincoln, to Nottingham Trent Bridge, in the County of Nottingham.
Maidstone and Wrotham and Strood Turnpike Road Act 1825	6 Geo. 4. c. xxv	31 March 1825
An Act for making and maintaining a Turnpike Road from the present Turnpike Road, between Maidstone and Wrotham, in the County of Kent, to Strood in the said County.
Leominster and Ledbury Road Act 1825 (repealed)	6 Geo. 4. c. xxvi	31 March 1825
An Act for making a Turnpike Road from the Hope Turnpike, in the Leominster and Hereford Road, to or near Burley Gate, in the Hereford and Bromyard Turnpike Road, and from thence to a Place called The Trumpet, in the Ledbury and Hereford Turnpike Road, all in the County of Hereford. (Repealed by Leominster and Ledbury Road Act 1855 (18 & 19 Vict. c. lxi))
Stockport Road Act 1825 (repealed)	6 Geo. 4. c. xxvii	31 March 1825
An Act for more effectually repairing and improving the Road from Stockport, in the County Palatine of Chester, to near New Houses, in the County of York, and other Roads in the said Counties, and in the County Palatine of Lancaster; and for making and maintaining several new Branches to communicate therewith. (Repealed by Stockport and Ashton Roads Act 1864 (27 & 28 Vict. c. clxxix))
Wooler and Adderstone Lane Road (Northumberland) Act 1825	6 Geo. 4. c. xxviii	31 March 1825
An Act for more effectually amending, widening, improving and keeping in Repair the Road from Wooler to the Great North Turnpike Road, at or near to Adderstone Lane, in the County of Northumberland.
River Weaver Navigation Act 1825	6 Geo. 4. c. xxix	2 May 1825
An Act to repeal certain Parts of and to alter and amend an Act passed in the Forty seventh Year of the Reign of His late Majesty King George the Third, (Note: Weaver Navigation Act 1807 (47 Geo. 3 Sess. 2. c. lxxxii)) to authorize the Trustees of the River Weaver Navigation to open a more convenient Communication between the said River near Frodsham Bridge, and the River Mersey near Weston Point, in the Township of Weston, in the County of Chester; and to amend Two Acts relative to the said River.
Cromford and High Peak Railway Act 1825 (repealed)	6 Geo. 4. c. xxx	2 May 1825
An Act for making and maintaining a Railway or Tram Road from Cromford Canal, at or near to Cromford, in the Parish of Wirksworth, in the County of Derby, to the Peak Forest Canal, at or near to Whaley (otherwise Yardsley-cum-Whaley), in the County Palatine of Chester. (Repealed by Cromford and High Peak Railway Act 1855 (18 & 19 Vict. c. lxxv))
Vauxhall Bridge Act 1825 (repealed)	6 Geo. 4. c. xxxi	2 May 1825
An Act to enable the Vauxhall Bridge Company to raise a further Sum of Money, and to alter and amend the Acts relating to the said Bridge. (Repealed by Local Law (Greater London Council and Inner London Boroughs) Order 1965 (SI 1965/540))
Oundle Improvement Act 1825	6 Geo. 4. c. xxxii	2 May 1825
An Act for lighting, watching, paving, cleansing, regulating and otherwise improving the Town of Oundle, in the County of Northampton.
St. Mary's Chapel, Hastings Act 1825	6 Geo. 4. c. xxxiii	2 May 1825
An Act for erecting a Chapel at Pelham Crescent, in the Parish of Saint Mary in the Castle, in the Liberty of the Town and Port of Hastings, in the County of Sussex.
Boston Gas Act 1825 (repealed)	6 Geo. 4. c. xxxiv	2 May 1825
An Act for lighting with Gas the Borough and Neighbourhood of Boston, in the County of Lincoln. (Repealed by Boston Gas Amendment Act 1856 (19 & 20 Vict. c. xxiii))
Glasgow Gas Light Company Act 1825 (repealed)	6 Geo. 4. c. xxxv	2 May 1825
An Act for enabling the Glasgow Gas Light Company to raise a further Sum of Money; and for other Purposes relating thereto. (Repealed by Glasgow Gas Act 1910 (10 Edw. 7 & 1 Geo. 5. c. cxxxi))
Dalkeith Two Pennies Scots Act 1825 (repealed)	6 Geo. 4. c. xxxvi	2 May 1825
An Act to continue and render more effectual certain Acts for laying a Duty of Two Pennies Scots, or One sixth Part of a Penny Sterling, on every Scots Pint of Ale or Beer brewed for Sale or vended within the Town and Parish of Dalkeith, for the Purposes therein mentioned. (Repealed by Statute Law (Repeals) Act 2013 (c. 2))
Royal Exchange Assurance Company's Act 1825 (repealed)	6 Geo. 4. c. xxxvii	2 May 1825
An Act to enable the Royal Exchange Assurance Companies, and their Successors, to advance Money, or lend Stock, upon the Security of Freehold, Copyhold or Leasehold Estates. (Repealed by Royal Exchange Assurance Act 1901 (1 Edw. 7. c. x))
Wakefield and Denby Dale Turnpike Road Act 1825 (repealed)	6 Geo. 4. c. xxxviii	2 May 1825
An Act for making and maintaining a Turnpike Road from Wakefield, to join the Shepley Lane Head Turnpike Road in Denby Dale, in the Parish of Penistone, with certain Branches, all in the West Riding of the County of York. (Repealed by Wakefield and Denby Dale Road Act 1852 (15 & 16 Vict. c. xciii))
Roads from Brighton and from Austy Cross Act 1825 (repealed)	6 Geo. 4. c. xxxix	2 May 1825
An Act for more effectually repairing the Roads from the Gloucester Hotel in the Town of Brighthelmstone, (Note: Brighthelmstone is now known as Brighton.) through the Towns of Cuckfield and Crawley, to the County Oak on Lovell Heath, and certain other Roads therein mentioned; and also for making and maintaining a Branch of Road from Austy Cross, in the Parish of Cuckfield, to West Grinsted; all in the County of Sussex. (Repealed by Brighton, Cuckfield and West Grinstead Turnpike Roads Act 1854 (17 & 18 Vict. c. cxxxvii))
Road from Haleworthy to Wadebridge (Cornwall) Act 1825 (repealed)	6 Geo. 4. c. xl	2 May 1825
An Act for more effectually repairing and improving the Road leading from Haleworthy, in the Parish of Davidstow, in the County of Cornwall, to the East End of Wadebridge; and from the West End of Wadebridge, into and through the Borough of Mitchell, in the said County. (Repealed by Haleworthy, Wadebridge and Mitchell Road (Cornwall) Act 1838 (1 & 2 Vict. c. vi))
Road from Deanburn to Cornhill and Coldstream Bridge Act 1825 (repealed)	6 Geo. 4. c. xli	2 May 1825
An Act for maintaining and improving the Road from Deanburn, in the County of Haddington, through Greenlaw, in the County of Berwick, to Cornhill, in the County of Durham; with Branches from Carfrae Mill through Lauder, from Orange Lane to Swinton Mill, and from Coldstream to Mount Pleasant, all in the County of Berwick; and for maintaining the Bridge over the River Tweed at Coldstream. (Repealed by Road from Deanburn to Cornhill (Berwickshire and Durham) Act 1846 (9 & 10 Vict. c. xlvi))
Eccleshill and Bradford Turnpike Road Act 1825	6 Geo. 4. c. xlii	2 May 1825
An Act for making and maintaining a Turnpike Road from Eccleshill to Bradford, in the County of York.
Sussex Roads Act 1825	6 Geo. 4. c. xliii	2 May 1825
An Act for more effectually repairing and widening the Road from Flimwell Vent, in the County of Sussex, through Highgate, in the County of Kent, and the Parishes of Sandhurst, Newenden and Northiam, to Taylor's Corner in the Parish of Rye, in the County of Sussex, and from Highgate aforesaid to Cooper's Corner, in the County of Sussex, and also a Piece of Road communicating with the said Road, called Whitebread Lane in the said County.
Halifax and Bradford Turnpike Road Act 1825	6 Geo. 4. c. xliv	2 May 1825
An Act for making and maintaining a Turnpike Road from Brighouse, in the Parish of Halifax, to Denholme Gate, in the Parish of Bradford, in the West Riding of the County of York.
Princes Risborough Roads Act 1825	6 Geo. 4. c. xlv	2 May 1825
An Act for more effectually repairing and improving certain Roads passing through Princes Risborough, in the County of Buckingham, and communicating with Aylesbury and Great Marlow in the said County, and Thame in the County of Oxford.
Road from Kingston-upon-Thames to Leatherhead Act 1825 (repealed)	6 Geo. 4. c. xlvi	2 May 1825
An Act for repairing the Road from Kingston upon Thames to Leatherhead, in the County of Surrey. (Repealed by Kingston and Leatherhead Turnpike Road Act 1861 (24 & 25 Vict. c. xxvii))
Barton Bridge and Farnworth Road Act 1825	6 Geo. 4. c. xlvii	2 May 1825
An Act for more effectually amending, widening and maintaining the Road from Barton Bridge, in the Parish of Eccles, through the Township of Worsley to Moses Gate in the Township of Farnworth, and for making, repairing and improving other Roads to communicate therewith, all in the County Palatine of Lancaster.
Barnsley and Pontefract Turnpike Road Act 1825 (repealed)	6 Geo. 4. c. xlviii	2 May 1825
An Act for making and maintaining a Turnpike Road from the Town of Barnsley, by way of Beaver Hole, to Cudworth Bridge, on the present Highway leading to the Town of Pontefract, in the West Riding of the County of York. (Repealed by Barnsley and Cudworth Bridge Road Act 1833 (3 & 4 Will. 4. c. xiii))
Roads from Bridgnorth to Cleobury Mortimer Act 1825 (repealed)	6 Geo. 4. c. xlix	2 May 1825
An Act for amending, maintaining and improving the Roads from Bridgnorth to Cleobury North, and also through Ditton Priors to the Brown Clee Hill, and from Cleobury Mortimer to several Places therein mentioned, and other Roads branching therefrom, in the Counties of Salop and Worcester. (Repealed by Cleobury District Roads Act 1856 (19 & 20 Vict. c. civ))
Road from Gravesend to Wrotham Act 1825 (repealed)	6 Geo. 4. c. l	2 May 1825
An Act for making and maintaining a Turnpike Road from the Town of Gravesend to Wrotham, in the County of Kent, and from thence to Borough Green on the Turnpike Road leading from Wrotham Heath to Ightham, in the said County. (Repealed by Gravesend and Wrotham Road Act 1853 (16 & 17 Vict. c. lxii))
Manchester and Ashton-under-Lyne Road Act 1825 (repealed)	6 Geo. 4. c. li	2 May 1825
An Act for making and maintaining a Road from Great Ancoats Street, in the Town of Manchester, in the County of Lancaster, to join a Diversion of the Manchester and Saltersbrook Road in Andershaw, in the Parish of Ashton under Line, in the said County, and Two Branches of Road communicating therewith. (Repealed by Manchester and Ashton-under-Lyne New Road Act 1851 (14 & 15 Vict. c. xli))
Rotherham and Tankersley Park Turnpike Road Act 1825 (repealed)	6 Geo. 4. c. lii	2 May 1825
An Act for amending and repairing the Turnpike Road leading from the North End of the Town of Rotherham to the East Side of Tankersley Park, in the County of York. (Repealed by Annual Turnpike Acts Continuance Act 1869 (32 & 33 Vict. c. 90))
Grantham and Bridge End Road Act 1825	6 Geo. 4. c. liii	2 May 1825
An Act for repairing the Road branching out of the Great North Road by the Guide Post at the South End of Spittlegate, in the Parish of Grantham, in the County of Lincoln, and leading from thence to the Turnpike Road at or near Bridge End, in the same County.
Stonehaven Harbour Act 1825	6 Geo. 4. c. liv	20 May 1825
An Act for improving and maintaining the Harbour of the Burgh of Barony of Stonehaven, in the County of Kincardine, and the Entrance thereto; and rendering more convenient and commodious the Streets and Avenues leading to the same.
St. James, Poole, Church Act 1825	6 Geo. 4. c. lv	20 May 1825
An Act for making more effectual Provision for paying off and discharging the Debts and Expences incurred in taking down and rebuilding the Parish Church of Saint James, in the Town and County of Poole, and the Tower of the same Church.
St. Luke, Chelsea, Church Act 1825	6 Geo. 4. c. lvi	20 May 1825
An Act for altering and amending an Act of the Fifty ninth Year of His late Majesty, (Note: St. Luke, Chelsea, Parish Church Act 1819 (59 Geo. 3. c. xxxv)) for building a new Church in the Parish of Saint Luke Chelsea, in the County of Middlesex.
St. Mary Stratford Bow Cemetery Act 1825 (repealed)	6 Geo. 4. c. lvii	20 May 1825
An Act for providing additional Burying Ground for the Parish of Saint Mary Stratford Bow, in the County of Middlesex. (Repealed by London Government (Borough of Poplar) Order in Council 1901 (SR&O 1901/220))
Chapel of the Holy and Undivided Trinity, Gosport Act 1825	6 Geo. 4. c. lviii	20 May 1825
An Act to provide for the perpetual Maintenance and Support of the Chapel of the Holy and Undivided Trinity, in the Town of Gosport, within the Parish of Alverstoke, in the County of Southampton.
Balgownie Bridge over River Don Act 1825	6 Geo. 4. c. lix	20 May 1825
An Act for building a Bridge over the River Don, near the Village of Balgownie or Polgownie, in the Parish of Old Machar and County of Aberdeen.
Kerne Bridge over River Wye Act 1825	6 Geo. 4. c. lx	20 May 1825
An Act for building a Bridge over the River Wye, at a Place called The Kerne, in the County of Hereford, and for making convenient Roads, Avenues and Approaches thereto.
Athlunkard Bridge over River Shannon Act 1825	6 Geo. 4. c. lxi	20 May 1825
An Act for the Erection of a Bridge across the River Shannon, at or near Athlunkard, and for making Approaches thereto.
Rumney Railway Act 1825 (repealed)	6 Geo. 4. c. lxii	20 May 1825
An Act for making and maintaining a Railway or Tram Road from the Northern Extremity of a certain Estate called Abertyswg, in the Parish of Bedwelty, in the County of Monmouth, to join the Sirhowy Railway, at or near Pye Corner, in the Parish of Bassaleg, in the same County. (Repealed by Rumney Railway Act 1861 (24 & 25 Vict. c. ccxxvii))
Nantlle Railway Act 1825	6 Geo. 4. c. lxiii	20 May 1825
An Act for making and maintaining a Railway or Tram Road from or near a certain Slate Quarry called Gloddfarlon, in the Parish of Llandwrog, in the County of Carnarvon, to the Town and Port of Carnarvon, in the same County.
East Country Dock Act 1825 (repealed)	6 Geo. 4. c. lxiv	20 May 1825
An Act to amend an Act of His late Majesty, (Note: East County Dock (Rotherhithe) Act 1811 (51 Geo. 3. c. clxxi)) for completing and maintaining the East Country Dock at Rotherhithe, in the County of Surrey, and to enlarge the Powers of the said Act. (Repealed by Surrey Commercial Dock Act 1864 (27 & 28 Vict. c. xxxi))
Aberdeen Public Offices Act 1825	6 Geo. 4. c. lxv	20 May 1825
An Act to alter and amend Two Acts of the Fifty fourth (Note: Aberdeen Courthouse, City and County Offices and Gaol Act 1814 (54 Geo. 3. c. c)) and Fifty ninth (Note: Aberdeen Court House and Gaol Act 1819 (59 Geo. 3. c. xxxiii)) Years of His late Majesty, for erecting and maintaining a new Court House and other Offices for the City and County of Aberdeen; and for providing an additional Gaol for the said City and County; and to provide a safe and convenient Place for the Custody and Preservation of the Public Records of the said City and County; and for other Purposes connected therewith.
Chesterfield Waterworks and Gas Light Company Act 1825 (repealed)	6 Geo. 4. c. lxvi	20 May 1825
An Act for supplying with Water the Town and Borough of Chesterfield, in the County of Derby, and for lighting the said Town and Borough with Gas. (Repealed by Chesterfield Waterworks and Gaslight Company's Act 1855 (18 & 19 Vict. c. xxix))
Ashton-under-Lyne Gas and Waterworks Act 1825 (repealed)	6 Geo. 4. c. lxvii	20 May 1825
An Act for lighting with Gas the Town of Ashton-under-Lyne and the Neighbourhood thereof, in the County Palatine of Lancaster, and the Township of Duckinfield, in the County Palatine of Chester; and for supplying with Water the said Town of Ashton-under-Lyne and the Neighbourhood thereof. (Repealed by Ashton-under-Lyne Gas Act 1847 (10 & 11 Vict. c. cci))
Stockport and Brinnington Water Act 1825	6 Geo. 4. c. lxviii	20 May 1825
An Act for better supplying with Water the Town and Township of Stockport, and the Township of Brinnington, and several other Townships adjoining thereto, in the Counties Palatine of Chester and Lancaster.
York Minster Act 1825	6 Geo. 4. c. lxix	20 May 1825
An Act for extending and rendering more effectual an Act of His late Majesty, (Note: York Minster Yard Act 1814 (54 Geo. 3. c. lxiii)) for enlarging and improving the Minster Yard of the Cathedral and Metropolitical Church of Saint Peter, in York.
Sudbury (Suffolk) Improvement Act 1825	6 Geo. 4. c. lxx	20 May 1825
An Act for paving, lighting, cleansing, watching, watering and improving the Town and Borough of Sudbury, in the County of Suffolk.
Leek Improvement Act 1825 (repealed)	6 Geo. 4. c. lxxi	20 May 1825
An Act for lighting watching cleansing and improving the Town of Leek, in the County of Stafford. (Repealed by Leek Improvement Act 1855 (18 & 19 Vict. c. cxxxii))
Newbury and Speenhamland Improvement Act 1825	6 Geo. 4. c. lxxii	20 May 1825
An Act for lighting, watching, paving, cleansing and improving the Streets, Highways and Places within the Borough, Town and Parish of Newbury, and the Tithing or Hamlet of Speenhamland, in the Parish of Speen, in the County of Berks.
Hanley and Shelton Improvement Act 1825 (repealed)	6 Geo. 4. c. lxxiii	20 May 1825
An Act for watching and lighting the Townships or Vills of Hanley and Shelton, in the Parish of Stoke upon Trent, in the County of Stafford. (Repealed by Local Government Board's Provisional Orders Confirmation (No. 3) Act 1908 (8 Edw. 7. c. clxiv))
Walcot Improvement Act 1825 (repealed)	6 Geo. 4. c. lxxiv	20 May 1825
An Act to amend an Act of His late Majesty for paving, cleansing, lighting, watching, and regulating the Streets and public Places within such Part of the Parish of Walcot, in the County of Somerset, as is not within the City of Bath. (Repealed by City of Bath Act 1851 (14 & 15 Vict. c. civ))
Liverpool Buildings and Docks Act 1825 or the Liverpool Building Act 1825 or the Liverpool Improvement/Building Act 1825	6 Geo. 4. c. lxxv	20 May 1825
An Act for the better regulation of Buildings within the Town of Liverpool in the County Palatine of Lancaster; and for authorizing the making of Bye Laws, Rules, and Regulations for Vessels frequenting the Docks, Basins, and Quays belonging to the Corporation there.
Croydon Rates Act 1825 (repealed)	6 Geo. 4. c. lxxvi	20 May 1825
An Act for better assessing and collecting the Poor and other Parochial Rates in the Parish of Croydon, in the County of Surrey. (Repealed by Statute Law (Repeals) Act 2008 (c. 12))
Chesterfield Lighting Act 1825 (repealed)	6 Geo. 4. c. lxxvii	20 May 1825
An Act for lighting the Town and Borough of Chesterfield, in the County of Derby. (Repealed by Local Government Supplemental (No. 5) Act 1867 (30 & 31 Vict. c. 83))
Norwich Improvement Act 1825 (repealed)	6 Geo. 4. c. lxxviii	20 May 1825
An Act for amending and enlarging an Act of His late Majesty (Note: Norwich Improvement Act 1806 (46 Geo. 3. c. lxvii)) for better paving, lighting, cleansing, watching and otherwise improving the City of Norwich. (Repealed by Norwich City Council Act 1984 (c. xxiii))
Birmingham Gas Act 1825	6 Geo. 4. c. lxxix	20 May 1825
An Act to establish an additional Company for more effectually lighting with Gas the Town of Birmingham, and certain other Parishes and Places, in the Counties of Warwick and Stafford.
Road from Leicester to Lutterworth Act 1825	6 Geo. 4. c. lxxx	20 May 1825
An Act for more effectually repairing, widening, altering and improving the Road from the Borough of Leicester to the Town of Lutterworth, in the County of Leicester.
Melton Mowbray and Leicester Road Act 1825	6 Geo. 4. c. lxxxi	20 May 1825
An Act for more effectually repairing, widening, altering and improving the Road from Melton Mowbray in the County of Leicester, to the Guide Post in Saint Margaret's Field, Leicester, and the Road branching from the said Road at or near a certain Place in the Lordship of Barkby, in the said County, called The Round Hill, to the Town of Barkby.
Road from Welford Bridge Act 1825 (repealed)	6 Geo. 4. c. lxxxii	20 May 1825
An Act for more effectually repairing, widening, altering and improving the Road from Welford Bridge, in the County of Northampton, to Milstone Lane, in the Town of Leicester. (Repealed by Leicester and Welford Road Act 1856 (19 & 20 Vict. c. xxv))
Manchester and Austerlands Road Act 1825 (repealed)	6 Geo. 4. c. lxxxiii	20 May 1825
An Act for more effectually improving the Roads from Manchester, in the County Palatine of Lancaster, through Oldham to Austerlands, in the Parish of Saddleworth, in the County of York; and from Oldham to Ashton-under-Line, and from Oldham to Rochdale, in the said County Palatine of Lancaster. (Repealed by Manchester and Oldham Road Act 1837 (7 Will. 4 & 1 Vict. c. xliii))
Trebarwith Sands and Condolden Bridge Road Act 1825	6 Geo. 4. c. lxxxiv	20 May 1825
An Act for making and maintaining a Turnpike Road from Trebarwith Sands on the Sea Shore, to Condolden Bridge, on the Road leading from Bossiney to Camelford, all in the County of Cornwall.
Road from Cockermouth to Maryport Act 1825 (repealed)	6 Geo. 4. c. lxxxv	20 May 1825
An Act for more effectually amending, improving and keeping in Repair the Road from the Town of Cockermouth to the Town of Maryport, and from thence by Allonby to Wigton, and several other Roads therein mentioned, all in the County of Cumberland. (Repealed by Roads from Cockermouth to Maryport Act 1843 (6 & 7 Vict. c. xvi))
Road from Lockwood to Meltham Act 1825 (repealed)	6 Geo. 4. c. lxxxvi	20 May 1825
An Act for amending, improving and maintaining the Road from Lockwood to Meltham, and the Branch of Road to Meltham Mills, all in the Parish of Almondbury, in the West Riding of the County of York. (Repealed by Lockwood and Meltham Turnpike Road Act 1852 (15 & 16 Vict. c. xvii))
Sheetbridge and Portsmouth Roads Act 1825	6 Geo. 4. c. lxxxvii	20 May 1825
An Act for more effectually repairing and improving the Roads from Sheet Bridge to Portsmouth, and from Petersfield to the Alton and Alresford Turnpike Road, near Ropley, in the County of Southampton; and for making and maintaining a new Branch of Road to communicate therewith.
Newton Abbott and Torquay Road Act 1825 (repealed)	6 Geo. 4. c. lxxxviii	20 May 1825
An Act for more effectually making and repairing the Roads between Newton Abbot and Brixham, Kingsweare and Dartmouth, Shaldon and Torquay, and also between Torquay and Saint Mary Church, and the Bridge to be built over the River Teign at Shaldon, and for making and repairing several other Roads communicating therewith, all in the County of Devon. (Repealed by Torquay Roads Act 1840 (3 & 4 Vict. c. xxxv))
Cromford and Newhaven Turnpike Road Act 1825 or the Cromford and Newhaven Road Act 1825	6 Geo. 4. c. lxxxix	20 May 1825
An Act for amending and maintaining the Road from the Market Place in Cromford to the Guide Post on Hopton Moor, and Two Branch Roads to Newhaven House and Wirksworth, all in the County of Derby.
Bawtry and Tinsley Turnpike Road Act 1825 (repealed)	6 Geo. 4. c. xc	20 May 1825
An Act for amending and maintaining the Turnpike Road from Bawtrey, through the Town of Tinsley, to the Road from Rotherham to Sheffield, in the West Riding of the County of York. (Repealed by Bawtry and Tinsley Road Act 1856 (19 & 20 Vict. c. lxxxii))
Tavistock and New Bridge Roads Act 1825	6 Geo. 4. c. xci	20 May 1825
An Act for more effectually repairing and improving several Roads leading from Tavistock to New Bridge, and other Roads therein mentioned, all in the County of Devon; and for making Diversions to communicate therewith.
Bolton-le-Moors and Haslingden Road and Branches Act 1825	6 Geo. 4. c. xcii	20 May 1825
An Act for making and maintaining a Road from Bradshaw Brow, near the Town of Bolton-le-Moors, in the County of Lancaster, to the Bury and Blackburn Turnpike Road, in the Township of Haslingden, in the same County, and Three Branches of Road communicating therewith.
Wiveliscombe Roads Act 1825 (repealed)	6 Geo. 4. c. xciii	20 May 1825
An Act for more effectually repairing several Roads leading from and through the Town of Wiveliscombe, in the County of Somerset, and the Roads adjoining thereto, in the Counties of Somerset and Devon, and for making a new Line of Road to communicate therewith. (Repealed by Wiveliscombe Turnpike Roads Act 1851 (14 & 15 Vict. c. xx))
Woodstock and Rollright Lane Roads (Oxfordshire) Act 1825 (repealed)	6 Geo. 4. c. xciv	20 May 1825
An Act for repairing certain Roads from the Borough of New Woodstock to Rollright Lane, and other Roads therein mentioned, in the County of Oxford. (Repealed by Woodstock and Rollright Lane Road (Oxfordshire) Act 1846 (9 & 10 Vict. c. vii))
Mullen's Pond (Southampton) and Salisbury Road and Branches Act 1825 (repealed)	6 Geo. 4. c. xcv	20 May 1825
An Act for repairing and amending the Road from Mullen's Pond, in the County of Southampton, through Amesbury, to the Eighteen Mile Stone from the City of New Sarum, near Willoughby Hedge, in the County of Wilts, and several other Roads leading out of the said Road. (Repealed by Mullen's Pond to New Sarum Road (Wiltshire) Act 1835 (5 & 6 Will. 4. c. xxxviii))
Cork and Ballyhooly Turnpike Road Act 1825	6 Geo. 4. c. xcvi	20 May 1825
An Act for making and maintaining a Turnpike Road from the City of Cork to the Town of Ballyhooly, on the River Blackwater.
Road from Leeds to Whitehall (Yorkshire) Act 1825 (repealed)	6 Geo. 4. c. xcvii	20 May 1825
An Act for making and maintaining a new Road from Leeds to Whitehall, near Halifax, and several Branch Roads therefrom, all in the West Riding of the County of York. (Repealed by Leeds and Whitehall Turnpike Roads Act 1853 (16 & 17 Vict. c. lxxiv))
Sheffield and Glossop Road Act 1825 (repealed)	6 Geo. 4. c. xcviii	20 May 1825
An Act for more effectually repairing and improving the Road from Sheffield, in the County of York, to the Marple Bridge Road, in the Parish of Glossop, in the County of Derby, and the Branch to Mortimer's Road, in the Parish of Hathersage, in the said County of Derby. (Repealed by Sheffield and Glossop Turnpike Road Act 1851 (14 & 15 Vict. c. cxxxiii))
Teignmouth and Dawlish and Exeter Roads Act 1825 (repealed)	6 Geo. 4. c. xcix	20 May 1825
An Act for more effectually maintaining and improving the Road from Teignmouth to Dawlish, and for making and maintaining Roads from Dawlish to the Exeter Turnpike Roads, together with a Road from Southtown to Chudleigh, and certain Branches communicating with the same, all in the County of Devon. (Repealed by Teignmouth and Dawlish Road Act 1836 (6 & 7 Will. 4. c. lxxxvi))
Weymouth, Melcombe Regis and Dorchester Roads Act 1825	6 Geo. 4. c. c	20 May 1825
An Act for more effectually repairing, widening and improving several Roads leading to and through the Towns of Weymouth, and Melcombe Regis and Dorchester, in the County of Dorset.
Road from Greenhill Moor (Derbyshire) Act 1825	6 Geo. 4. c. ci	20 May 1825
An Act for more effectually repairing the Road from Greenhill Moor to Hernstone Lane Head Road, near Stony Middleton, and other Roads therein mentioned, in the County of Derby, and in the West Riding of the County of York; and for making an Extension and Branch of Road therefrom.
Road from Huddersfield to Rochdale Act 1825 (repealed)	6 Geo. 4. c. cii	20 May 1825
An Act for repairing and maintaining the Road from Huddersfield, in the West Riding of the County of York, to New Hey, in the Parish of Rochdale, in the County of Lancaster, with a Branch to Toothill Lane in the said Riding; and for making a new Road from Buck Stones to the Highway leading from Ripponden to Stainland, at or near to Barkisland School. (Repealed by Huddersfield and New Hey Turnpike Road Act 1851 (14 & 15 Vict. c. lix))
Meltham and Austonley Turnpike Road Act 1825	6 Geo. 4. c. ciii	20 May 1825
An Act for making and maintaining a Turnpike Road from Meltham, in the Parish of Almondbury, to the Greenfield and Shepley Lane Head Turnpike Road, near Wessenden Head, in the Township of Austonley, in the West Riding of the County of York.
Duffryn Llynvi and Porthcawl Railway Act 1825	6 Geo. 4. c. civ	10 June 1825
An Act for making and maintaining a Railway or Tram Road from or from near to a certain Place called Duffryn Llynvi, in the Parish of Llangonoyd, in the County of Glamorgan, to or near to a certain Bay called Pwll Cawl, otherwise Porth Cawl, in the Parish of Newton Nottage, in the same County; and for extending and improving the same Bay, by the Erection of a Pier and other suitable Works for that Purpose.
St. Katharine's Dock Act 1825 (repealed)	6 Geo. 4. c. cv	10 June 1825
An Act for making and constructing certain Wet Docks, Warehouses, and other Works in the Parish of Saint Botolph without Aldgate and in the Parish or Precinct of Saint Katharine near the Tower of London in the County of Middlesex. (Repealed by Port of London (Consolidation) Act 1920 (10 & 11 Geo. 5. c. clxxiii))
Greenock Water Act 1825 (repealed)	6 Geo. 4. c. cvi	10 June 1825
An Act for collecting the Shaws Water, and applying the same to the driving Mills and Machinery, near the Town of Greenock, in the County of Renfrew, and for supplying the said Town and Harbour thereof with Water. (Repealed by Greenock and Shaws Water Transfer Act 1866 (29 & 30 Vict. c. cccviii))
Glasgow Improvement and Markets Act 1825	6 Geo. 4. c. cvii	10 June 1825
An Act for establishing additional Market Places in the City of Glasgow, for opening certain Streets and Communications therein, and otherwise improving the said City.
Renfrew Roads Act 1825	6 Geo. 4. c. cviii	10 June 1825
An Act for amending and continuing several Acts (Note: Renfrew, Lanark and Ayr Turnpike Roads Act 1804 (44 Geo. 3. c. lii)) (Note: Roads in Renfrew, Lanark and Ayr Act 1820 (1 Geo. 4. c. lxxxiii)) for repairing Roads in the County of Renfrew.
Banff, Aberdeen and Elgin Roads and Spey and Dovern Bridges Act 1825 (repealed)	6 Geo. 4. c. cix	10 June 1825
An Act for more effectually making, maintaining, and repairing certain Roads in the Counties of Banff, Aberdeen, and Elgin, and for building Bridges over the Rivers Spey and Dovern. (Note: Dovern is an old spelling of Deveron.) (Repealed by Banff, Aberdeen and Elgin Roads and Spey Bridges Act 1846 (9 & 10 Vict. c. ccxxvii))
Roads, Bridges and Statute Labour in Ross, Cromarty and Nairn Act 1825 (repealed)	6 Geo. 4. c. cx	10 June 1825
An Act to amend certain Acts (Note: Statute Labour, Roads and Bridges in Ross, Cromarty and Nairn Act 1807 (47 Geo. 3 Sess. 1. c. xiii)) (Note: Roads, Bridges and Statute Labour in Ross, Cromarty and Nairn Act 1810 (50 Geo. 3. c. clxxxix)) (Note: Roads, Bridges and Statute Labour in Ross and Cromarty Act 1813 (53 Geo. 3. c. cxxxvi)) for making and maintaining Roads, and converting the Statute Labour, in the Counties of Ross and Cromarty, and Part of Nairn, locally situate in the County of Ross. (Repealed by Ross and Cromartyshire District Roads Act 1847 (10 & 11 Vict. c. lxix))
Glasgow Streets Act 1825	6 Geo. 4. c. cxi	10 June 1825
An Act to amend an Act (Note: Glasgow Improvement Act 1820 (1 Geo. 4. c. lxxxviii)) for making certain Streets in the City of Glasgow; and for forming a Street from King Street to Stockwell Street, and from thence to Howard Street, in the said City.
Salford Quarter Sessions' Chairman's Salary Act 1825 (repealed)	6 Geo. 4. c. cxii	10 June 1825
An Act to enlarge the Powers of an Act of His late Majesty's Reign, (Note: Salford Quarter Sessions' Chairman's Salary Act 1805 (45 Geo. 3. c. lix)) to empower the Justices of the Peace within the Hundred of Salford, in the County Palatine of Lancaster, to raise a Sum of Money, to be paid by way of Salary to the Chairman of the Quarter Sessions for the said Hundred. (Repealed by Lancashire Quarter Sessions Act 1928 (18 & 19 Geo. 5. c. xxx))
Gloucester and Berkeley Canal Act 1825	6 Geo. 4. c. cxiii	10 June 1825
An Act for enabling the Gloucester and Berkeley Canal Company to raise a further Sum of Money, and for altering, amending and enlarging the Powers and Provisions contained in the several Acts for making the said Canal.
Great Grimsby Haven Act 1825 (repealed)	6 Geo. 4. c. cxiv	10 June 1825
An Act for amending and rendering more effectual Two Acts of the Thirty sixth (Note: Great Grimsby (Lincoln) Harbour Act 1796 (36 Geo. 3. c. 98)) and Thirty ninth (Note: Grimsby Haven Navigation and Improvement Act 1799 (39 Geo. 3. c. lxx)) Years of His late Majesty, for improving the Haven of Great Grimsby, in the County of Lincoln. (Repealed by Grimsby Docks Act 1845 (8 & 9 Vict. c. ccii))
New Pembrey Harbour Act 1825	6 Geo. 4. c. cxv	10 June 1825
An Act for making and constructing a Harbour and other Works, in the Parish of Pembrey, in the County of Carmarthen; and for making a Canal and Railway from the said Harbour to the Kidwelly and Llanelly Canal, in the said County.
Weymouth and Melcombe Regis Harbour and Bridge Act 1825	6 Geo. 4. c. cxvi	10 June 1825
An Act to amend and enlarge the Powers and Provisions of several Acts relating to the Harbour and Bridge of the Borough and Town of Weymouth and Melcombe Regis, in the County of Dorset.
Glasgow Harbour and Clyde Navigation Act 1825 (repealed)	6 Geo. 4. c. cxvii	10 June 1825
An Act for amending Three Acts (Note: Clyde Bridge Act 1758 (32 Geo. 2. c. 62)) (Note: River Clyde Navigation Act 1770 (10 Geo. 3. c. 104)) (Note: River Clyde Navigation Act 1809 (49 Geo. 3. c. lxxiv)) for enlarging the Harbour of Glasgow, and improving the Navigation of the River Clyde to the said City; and for other Purposes therein mentioned. (Repealed by Clyde Navigation Consolidation Act 1858 (21 & 22 Vict. c. cxlix))
South London Docks Act 1825	6 Geo. 4. c. cxviii	10 June 1825
An Act for making Wet Docks, Warehouses and other Works, in and near to Saint Saviour's Dock, in the Parishes of Saint John Southwark, and Saint Mary Magdalen Bermondsey, in the County of Surrey, to be called The South London Docks.
Collier Dock Act 1825	6 Geo. 4. c. cxix	10 June 1825
An Act for making and constructing certain Wet Docks, Warehouses and other Works, for the Accommodation and better Security of Ships and other Vessels in the Coal and other Trades, in the Isle of Dogs, in the Parish of All Saints Poplar, in the County of Middlesex.
Canterbury and Whitstable Railway Act 1825	6 Geo. 4. c. cxx	10 June 1825
An Act for making and maintaining a Railway or Tram Road from the Sea Shore, at or near Whitstable, in the County of Kent, to or near to the City of Canterbury, in the said County.
Portland Railway Act 1825	6 Geo. 4. c. cxxi	10 June 1825
An Act for making and maintaining a Railway or Tram Road, in the Parish of Saint George, in the Island of Portland, in the County of Dorset.
Brighthelmston Chapels Act 1825	6 Geo. 4. c. cxxii	10 June 1825
An Act for building Two Chapels in the Town of Brighthelmston in the County of Sussex.
Montgomery and Pool Poor Relief Act 1825 (repealed)	6 Geo. 4. c. cxxiii	10 June 1825
An Act to repeal Two Acts respectively of the Thirty second (Note: Montgomery Poor Relief Act 1792 (32 Geo. 3. c. 96)) and Thirty sixth (Note: Poor (Shropshire) etc. Act 1796 (36 Geo. 3. c. 38)) Years of His late Majesty King George the Third, for the better Relief and Employment of the Poor of the Montgomery and Pool United District, and to provide new Powers and Regulations in lieu thereof. (Repealed by Statute Law (Repeals) Act 2013 (c. 2))
Chester Dee Bridges Act 1825	6 Geo. 4. c. cxxiv	10 June 1825
An Act for erecting an additional Bridge over the River Dee, in the City of Chester, for opening and making convenient Roads and Approaches thereto, and for taking down and re building the Parish Church of Saint Bridget, within the said City, and for repairing the present Bridge over the River Dee.
Kingston-upon-Thames Bridge Act 1825	6 Geo. 4. c. cxxv	10 June 1825
An Act for the rebuilding of Kingston Bridge, and for improving and making suitable Approaches thereto.
Montrose (South Esk) Bridge Act 1825	6 Geo. 4. c. cxxvi	10 June 1825
An Act to amend Two Acts (Note: Montrose Bridge Act 1792 (32 Geo. 3. c. 38)) (Note: Montrose Bridge Act 1810 (50 Geo. 3. c. l)) for building a Bridge over the River South Esk, at or near the Town of Montrose, in the County of Forfar.
York Improvement Act 1825	6 Geo. 4. c. cxxvii	10 June 1825
An Act for paving, lighting, watching and improving the City of York and the Suburbs thereof, and the Liberty of Saint Peter within the said City; and for regulating the Police of the same respectively.
Rochdale Improvement Act 1825 (repealed)	6 Geo. 4. c. cxxviii	10 June 1825
An Act for lighting, cleansing, watching and regulating the Town of Rochdale, in the County Palatine of Lancaster. (Repealed by Rochdale Improvement Act 1844 (7 & 8 Vict. c. civ))
Louth Improvement Act 1825	6 Geo. 4. c. cxxix	10 June 1825
An Act for paving, lighting, watching, cleansing, regulating and otherwise improving the Town and Parish of Louth, in the County of Lincoln.
Banbury Improvement Act 1825 or the Banbury Paving Act 1825 (repealed)	6 Geo. 4. c. cxxx	10 June 1825
An Act for paving, cleansing, lighting, watching and otherwise improving the several Streets, Lanes, public Passages and Places, in the Borough of Banbury, in the County of Oxford. (Repealed by Oxfordshire Act 1985 (c. xxxiv))
Burslem Markets, Lighting and Police Act 1825 (repealed)	6 Geo. 4. c. cxxxi	10 June 1825
An Act for regulating the Markets in the Town of Burslem, in the County of Stafford; and for lighting regulating the Police and watching the said Town of Burslem, and the Vills of Longport, Cobridge, Sneyd Green, and Parts adjacent, in the Parish of Burslem. (Repealed by Local Government Board's Provisional Order Confirmation (No. 3) Act 1908 (8 Edw. 7. c. clxiv))
Derby Improvement Act 1825 (repealed)	6 Geo. 4. c. cxxxii	10 June 1825
An Act for better paving and otherwise improving the Borough of Derby. (Repealed by Derbyshire Act 1981 (c. xxxiv) (Note: Incorrectly cited as "Derb. 1981 (c.cxxxii)" in the Chronological Table of Local Acts.))
Leamington Priors Improvement Act 1825 (repealed)	6 Geo. 4. c. cxxxiii	10 June 1825
An Act for paving or flagging, lighting, cleansing, watching, regulating and improving the Town of Leamington Priors, in the County of Warwick. (Repealed by Warwick District Council Act 1984 (c. xxiv))
Tothill Fields Improvement Act 1825	6 Geo. 4. c. cxxxiv	10 June 1825
An Act for paving, draining, cleansing, lighting, watching and improving the Streets and public Places which are or shall be made upon certain Grounds in the Parishes of Saint Margaret and Saint John the Evangelist, in the City of Westminster, commonly called Tothill Fields.
Bognor Improvement and Market Act 1825	6 Geo. 4. c. cxxxv	10 June 1825
An Act to amend an Act passed in the Third Year of the Reign of His present Majesty, intituled "An Act to establish a Market for the Sale of Butcher's Meat and other Articles, and to repair and amend certain Roads in the Town or Tithing of Bognor, in the County of Sussex," (Note: Bognor Market and Roads Act 1822 (3 Geo. 4. c. lvii)) and for making a Road along the Sea Coast, and for otherwise improving the said Town or Tithing.
Rochester, Chatham and Strood Gas Light Company Act 1825 (repealed)	6 Geo. 4. c. cxxxvi	10 June 1825
An Act to incorporate a Company for lighting with Gas the City of Rochester, and Towns of Chatham and Strood, in the County of Kent, and Parts adjacent thereto respectively. (Repealed by Rochester, Chatham and Strood Gaslight Company's Act 1867 (30 & 31 Vict. c. lxxvi))
Louth Gas Company Act 1825 (repealed)	6 Geo. 4. c. cxxxvii	10 June 1825
An Act for establishing a Company for lighting with Gas the Town of Louth, in the County of Lincoln. (Repealed by Louth Gas Act 1877 (40 & 41 Vict. c. ccix))
Beverley Improvement Act 1825 (repealed)	6 Geo. 4. c. cxxxviii	10 June 1825
An Act to amend and enlarge the Powers of an Act passed in the Forty eighth Year of the Reign of His late Majesty King George the Third, (Note: Beverley Improvement Act 1808 (48 Geo. 3. c. lxxxvii)) for lighting, watching and regulating the Streets, Lanes and other public Passages and Places within the Town of Beverley, in the County of York. (Repealed by Humberside Act 1982 (c. iii))
Tiverton Markets Act 1825	6 Geo. 4. c. cxxxix	10 June 1825
An Act for removing the Markets held within the Town of Tiverton, in the County of Devon; for providing a Market Place in the said Town, and for regulating and maintaining the said Markets.
Gorbals Statute Labour Conversion Act 1825	6 Geo. 4. c. cxl	10 June 1825
An Act for regulating the Conversion of the Statute Labour within the Barony of Gorbals, in the City of Glasgow and County of Lanark.
Irish Company for Promoting Manufactures Act 1825	6 Geo. 4. c. cxli	10 June 1825
An Act for establishing a Joint Stock Company for the Erection of Buildings and establishing Machinery for the Purpose of promoting and encouraging Manufactures in Ireland.
Birmingham and Pershore Turnpike Road Act 1825	6 Geo. 4. c. cxlii	10 June 1825
An Act for making and maintaining a Turnpike Road from the Town of Birmingham to or near the Town of Pershore.
Cirencester Roads Act 1825 (repealed)	6 Geo. 4. c. cxliii	10 June 1825
An Act for maintaining and improving certain Roads leading to and from the Town of Cirencester, in the County of Gloucester. (Repealed by Cirencester Roads Act 1862 (25 & 26 Vict. c. xiii))
Sheffield and Chapel-en-le-Frith Roads Act 1825 or the Roads in Yorkshire and Derbyshire Act 1825 (repealed)	6 Geo. 4. c. cxliv	10 June 1825
An Act for repealing Two Acts (Note: Yorkshire and Derby Roads Act 1795 (35 Geo. 3. c. 164)) (Note: Roads from Little Sheffield Sparrow Pit Gate Act 1811 (51 Geo. 3. c. lxxv)) for repairing the Roads from Little Sheffield in the County of York, to Sparrow Pitt Gate in the County of Derby; and also an Act (Note: Banner Cross and Fox House Turnpike Road and Branch Act 1812 (52 Geo. 3. c. cxvi)) for making a Road from Banner Cross in the West Riding of the County of York, to Fox House in the County of Derby; and for consolidating the Trusts of certain Roads mentioned in the said Acts; and for amending and making certain other Roads to communicate therewith; and for other Purposes relating thereto. (Repealed by Sheffield and Chapel-en-le-Frith Roads Act 1862 (25 & 26 Vict. c. cxxxiv))
Rochdale and Burnley Road Act 1825 (repealed)	6 Geo. 4. c. cxlv	10 June 1825
An Act for repairing the Road leading from the Town of Rochdale in the County Palatine of Lancaster to the Town of Burnley, in the said County, and for repairing and making certain other Roads to communicate therewith. (Repealed by Rochdale and Burnley Road Act 1837 (7 Will. 4 & 1 Vict. c. vi))
Worksop and Attercliffe Road Act 1825 (repealed)	6 Geo. 4. c. cxlvi	10 June 1825
An Act for amending, repairing and maintaining the Road from Worksop, in the County of Nottingham, to the North-east End of Attercliffe, in the County of York. (Repealed by Worksop and Attercliffe Road Act 1857 (20 & 21 Vict. c. xcix))
Road from Cheltenham to Gloucester Act 1825 (repealed)	6 Geo. 4. c. cxlvii	10 June 1825
An Act for more effectually repairing and improving so much of the Road leading from the Town of Cheltenham, in the County of Gloucester, towards the City of Gloucester, as lies within the Cheltenham District, and for opening new Communications with such Road. (Repealed by Cheltenham and Gloucester Turnpike Road Act 1851 (14 & 15 Vict. c. xii))
Denbigh and Fynnon Eidda Turnpike Road Act 1825	6 Geo. 4. c. cxlviii	10 June 1825
An Act for making and maintaining a Turnpike Road from the Town of Denbigh, in the County of Denbigh, to Pentre Voelas, in the said County, and from thence to Fynnon Eidda, in the County of Carnarvon.
Leeds and Halifax Turnpike Roads and Branches Act 1825	6 Geo. 4. c. cxlix	10 June 1825
An Act for repairing, widening improving and maintaining in Repair the Turnpike Roads from Leeds to Halifax, and the several Branches and Roads therein mentioned, in the West Riding of the County of York.
York and Oswaldkirk Bank Road Act 1825	6 Geo. 4. c. cl	10 June 1825
An Act for repairing the Road from the City of York to the Top of Oswaldkirk Bank, in the County of York.
Barnsley and Grange Moor Road Act 1825	6 Geo. 4. c. cli	10 June 1825
An Act for more effectually improving the Roads from Barnsley Common to Grange Moor and White Cross, and for making a Diversion of the said Roads from or near to Redbrook, in the Township of Barugh to Barnsley, all in the West Riding of the County of York.
Kingston-upon-Hull and Ferriby Road Act 1825 (repealed)	6 Geo. 4. c. clii	10 June 1825
An Act for making and maintaining a Turnpike Road from the Town of Kingston-upon-Hull, through the Town of Hessle, to the East End of the Town of Ferriby, all in the County of the Town of Kingston-upon-Hull. (Repealed by Kingston-upon-Hull, Hessle and Ferriby Turnpike Road Act 1855 (18 & 19 Vict. c. lxviii))
Upton-upon-Severn Roads Act 1825	6 Geo. 4. c. cliii	10 June 1825
An Act for making and maintaining a Turnpike Road from Shepley Lane Head, to join the Barnsley and Grange Moor Turnpike Road, at or near Redbrook Plantation, in the Parish of Darton, all in the West Riding of the County of York.
Shepley Lane Head and Darton Road (Yorkshire, West Riding) Act 1825 (repealed)	6 Geo. 4. c. cliv	10 June 1825
An Act for repairing the Road from Bridgetown in the Parish of Old Stratford in the County of Warwick to the Top of Long Compton Hill in the same County, and a certain other Road in the Counties of Warwick, Worcester and Gloucester; and for making a new Branch of Road from the Village of Long Compton aforesaid, into the Turnpike Road leading from Long Compton Hill to Woodstock, in the County of Oxford. (Repealed by Road from Shepley Lane Head to Barnsley and Grange Moor Road Act 1845 (8 & 9 Vict. c. cl))
Warwick, Worcester, Gloucester and Oxford Roads Act 1825 (repealed)	6 Geo. 4. c. clv	10 June 1825
An Act for repairing the Road from Bridgetown, in the Parish of Old Stratford, in the County of Warwick, to the Top of Long Compton Hill, in the same County, and a certain other Road in the Counties of Warwick, Worcester, and Gloucester; and for making a new Branch of Road from the Village of Long Compton aforesaid into the Turnpike Road leading from Long Compton Hill to Woodstock, in the County of Oxford. (Repealed by Statute Law (Repeals) Act 2013 (c. 2))
Battle Bridge and Holloway Road (Middlesex) Act 1825 (repealed)	6 Geo. 4. c. clvi	10 June 1825
An Act for making and maintaining a public Carriage Road from Battle Bridge in the Parish of Saint Pancras, to Holloway, in the Parish of Saint Mary Islington, in the County of Middlesex. (Repealed by Battle Bridge and Holloway Road (Middlesex) Act 1848 (11 & 12 Vict. c. xlviii))
Road from Knightsbridge to Counters Bridge Act 1825 (repealed)	6 Geo. 4. c. clvii	10 June 1825
An Act for more effectually repairing, widening and improving the Road from Knightsbridge to Counters Bridge, and certain other Roads in the County of Middlesex; and for lighting, watching and watering the said Roads. (Repealed by Metropolis Roads Act 1826 (7 Geo. 4. c. cxlii))
Road from North Malton Gate to Pickering Act 1825	6 Geo. 4. c. clviii	10 June 1825
An Act for amending and maintaining the Road from the North End of Old Malton Gate, in the Town and Borough of New Malton, to the Town of Pickering, in the County of York.
Crewkerne Roads Act 1825	6 Geo. 4. c. clix	10 June 1825
An Act for repairing several Roads leading to and from the Town of Crewkerne in the County of Somerset, and other Roads in the same County.
Earls Court and North End Turnpike Road and Junction with London and Fulham Road Act 1825	6 Geo. 4. c. clx	10 June 1825
An Act for making and maintaining a Turnpike Road from Brompton and Earles Court, in the Parish of Saint Mary Abbott's, Kensington, in the County of Middlesex, to communicate with the Road called Fulham Fields Road at North End, in the same County; and for making another Turnpike Road to communicate therewith from the High Road from London to Fulham, in the said County.
Shiffnall Roads Act 1825 (repealed)	6 Geo. 4. c. clxi	10 June 1825
An Act for maintaining and improving the Roads leading through the Town of Shiffnall, and the Road leading from Oaken Gates to Weston, in the Counties of Salop and Stafford. (Repealed by Statute Law (Repeals) Act 2013 (c. 2))
Devizes Improvement Act 1825	6 Geo. 4. c. clxii	22 June 1825
An Act for paving, lighting, cleansing, watching and improving the Borough of Devizes, in the County of Wilts, and for removing and preventing Nuisances and Annoyances therein.
Liskeard and Looe Canal Act 1825	6 Geo. 4. c. clxiii	22 June 1825
An Act for making and maintaining a navigable Canal from Tarras Pill, in the Parish of Duloe, in the County of Cornwall, to or near Moors Water, in the Parish of Liskeard in the said County, and for making several Roads to communicate therewith.
Baybridge Canal Act 1825	6 Geo. 4. c. clxiv	22 June 1825
An Act for making and maintaining a navigable Cut or Canal from the River Adur, at or near Binesbridge, in the Parish of West Grinsted, in the County of Sussex, to Baybridge, in the said Parish.
Ancholme Drainage and Navigation Act 1825	6 Geo. 4. c. clxv	22 June 1825
An Act for altering and enlarging the Powers of Two Acts of His late Majesty King George the Third, (Note: River Ancholme Navigation and Drainage Act 1766 (7 Geo. 3. c. 98)) (Note: River Ancholme Drainage and Navigation Act 1802 (42 Geo. 3. c. cxvi)) for draining Lands within the Level of Ancholme, in the County of Lincoln, and making certain Parts of the River Ancholme navigable.
Canterbury Navigation and Sandwich Harbour Act 1825	6 Geo. 4. c. clxvi	22 June 1825
An Act for improving the Navigation of the River Stour and Sandwich Haven, from the City of Canterbury to the Town and Port of Sandwich, in the County of Kent; and for making and maintaining a new Haven from the said Town and Port of Sandwich to the Sea, and a Harbour on the Sea Shore.
American and Colonial Steam Navigation Company Act 1825	6 Geo. 4. c. clxvii	22 June 1825
An Act to facilitate Intercourse by Steam Navigation between the United Kingdom and the Continent and Islands of America and the West Indies.
Stratford and Moreton Railway Act 1825	6 Geo. 4. c. clxviii	22 June 1825
An Act to amend an Act passed in the First and Second Year of the Reign of His present Majesty, intituled "An Act for making and maintaining a Railway or Tram Road from Stratford upon Avon, in the County of Warwick, to Moreton in Marsh, in the County of Gloucester, with a Branch to Shipston upon Stour, in the County of Worcester," (Note: Stratford and Moreton Railway Act 1821 (1 & 2 Geo. 4. c. lxiii)) and for making further Provisions touching the same.
West Lothian Railway Act 1825	6 Geo. 4. c. clxix	22 June 1825
An Act for making and maintaining a Railway from the Edinburgh and Glasgow Union Canal, at or near Ryal, in the Parish of Uphall, to Whitburn and other Places, in the Counties of Linlithgow and Lanark.
Arundel Port Act 1825	6 Geo. 4. c. clxx	22 June 1825
An Act for the more effectual Security of the Harbour of Littlehampton, called Arundel Port, in the County of Sussex.
Oldham Gas and Water Act 1825	6 Geo. 4. c. clxxi	22 June 1825
An Act for lighting with Gas the Town of Oldham, and the Neighbourhood thereof, within the Parish of Prestwich-cum-Oldham, in the County Palatine of Lancaster; and for the better supplying the Inhabitants of the said Town and Neighbourhood with Water.
Limerick Water Act 1825	6 Geo. 4. c. clxxii	22 June 1825
An Act for supplying the City and Suburbs of Limerick, in the County of the City of Limerick, with Water.
Water of Leith Act 1825	6 Geo. 4. c. clxxiii	22 June 1825
An Act for providing a greater and more regular Supply of Water, in the River called The Water of Leith, in the County of Edinburgh.
Henley-upon-Thames Rates Act 1825 (repealed)	6 Geo. 4. c. clxxiv	22 June 1825
An Act for better assessing and collecting the Poor and other Parochial Rates within the Town and Parish of Henley upon Thames, in the County of Oxford. (Repealed by Oxfordshire Act 1985 (c. xxxiv))
St. Andrew Holborn and St. George the Martyr Poor Relief Act 1825 (repealed)	6 Geo. 4. c. clxxv	22 June 1825
An Act for the better ascertaining, charging and collecting of the Rates for the Relief of the Poor within that Part of the Parish of Saint Andrew Holborn which lies above the Bars, in the County of Middlesex, and the Parish of Saint George the Martyr, in the said County; for the better Maintenance, Employment, and Regulation of the Poor thereof, and for regulating the Nightly Watch thereof. (Repealed by London Government (Borough of Holborn) Order in Council 1901 (SR&O 1901/269))
St. Botolph-without-Bishopsgate Tithes Act 1825 (repealed)	6 Geo. 4. c. clxxvi	22 June 1825
An Act for extinguishing Tithes and Customary Payments in lieu of Tithes, within the Parish of Saint Botolph without Bishopsgate, in the Liberties of the City of London; and for making Compensation to the Rector for the Time being in lieu thereof. (Repealed by City of London (Various Powers) Act 1950 (14 Geo. 6. c. v))
Godalming Improvement Act 1825 (repealed)	6 Geo. 4. c. clxxvii	22 June 1825
An Act for paving, lighting, watching and otherwise improving the Town of Godalming, in the County of Surrey. (Repealed by Local Government Board's Provisional Orders Confirmation (Godalming, &c.) Act 1881 (44 & 45 Vict. c. i))
Canterbury Streets Act 1825 (repealed)	6 Geo. 4. c. clxxviii	22 June 1825
An Act for enabling the Commissioners of the Pavement of the City of Canterbury to improve and alter the Line of certain Streets, called Palace Street, The Borough of Staplegate and Northgate Street, from the Entrance into the Archbishop's Palace, in Palace Street, to Cold Harbour Lane, in Northgate Street aforesaid, within the said City of Canterbury, and the County of the same City, and the County of Kent. (Repealed by Local Government Board's Provisional Orders Confirmation (No. 9) Act 1890 (53 & 54 Vict. c. clxxviii))
Brighthelmston Improvement and Poor Relief Act 1825 or the Brighton Town Act 1825	6 Geo. 4. c. clxxix	22 June 1825
An Act for the better regulating, paving, improving, and managing the Town of Brighthelmston in the County of Sussex, and the Poor thereof.
Londonderry Improvement Act 1825	6 Geo. 4. c. clxxx	22 June 1825
An Act to amend several Acts relating to the City of Londonderry.
Arigna Iron and Coal Company Act 1825	6 Geo. 4. c. clxxxi	22 June 1825
An Act to encourage the working of Mines in Ireland, by means of English Capital, and to regulate a Joint Stock Company for that Purpose, to be called "The Arigna Iron and Coal Company."
Hibernian Mining Company Act 1825	6 Geo. 4. c. clxxxii	22 June 1825
An Act to alter, amend and enlarge the Powers of an Act passed in the Fifth Year of the Reign of His present Majesty, intituled "An Act to encourage the working of Mines in Ireland, by means of English Capital, and to regulate a Joint Stock Company for that Purpose." (Note: Hibernian Mining Company Act 1824 (5 Geo. 4. c. cxxxvi))
Dundee Improvement Act 1825	6 Geo. 4. c. clxxxiii	22 June 1825
An Act for opening certain Streets, in the Burgh of Dundee, and otherwise improving the said Burgh.
Cirencester, Preston and Siddington Improvement Act 1825 (repealed)	6 Geo. 4. c. clxxxiv	22 June 1825
An Act for paving, cleansing, draining, lighting, watching, regulating and improving the Town of Cirencester, and for disposing of certain Common and Waste Lands and Common Rights within the Parishes of Cirencester and Preston, and for making Drains through the said Parishes, and the Parish of Siddington, in the County of Gloucester. (Repealed by Local Government Board's Provisional Orders Confirmation (Bilbrough, &c.) Act 1876 (39 & 40 Vict. c. cciii))
Road from Doncaster to Baln Croft Barn Act 1825	6 Geo. 4. c. clxxxv	22 June 1825
An Act for making and maintaining a Turnpike Road from Doncaster, through Hatfield, to Baln Croft Barn, near Thorne, with One Branch therefrom, in the West Riding of the County of York.
Felbrigg, Aylmerton, Melton, Sustead and Gresham Inclosures Act 1825	6 Geo. 4. c. clxxxvi	22 June 1825
An Act for inclosing Lands in the Parishes of Felbrigg, Aylmerton, Metton, Sustead and Gresham, in the County of Norfolk.
Liverpool Improvement Act 1825 (repealed)	6 Geo. 4. c. clxxxvii	27 June 1825
An Act for the further Improvement of the Port and Harbour and Town of Liverpool, and for altering, extending and amending the several Acts (Note: Liverpool Docks Act 1709 (8 Ann. c. 8)) (Note: Liverpool Docks Act 1716 (3 Geo. 1. c. 1 Pr.)) (Note: Liverpool Dock Act 1737 (11 Geo. 2. c. 32)) (Note: Liverpool Harbour Act 1762 (2 Geo. 3. c. 86)) (Note: Liverpool Harbour Act 1785 (25 Geo. 3. c. 15)) (Note: Liverpool Harbour Act 1799 (39 Geo. 3. c. lix)) (Note: Liverpool Port and Town Improvement Act 1811 (51 Geo. 3. c. cxliii)) (Note: Liverpool Improvement Act 1813 (53 Geo. 3. c. clvi)) (Note: Liverpool Harbour and Isle of Anglesea Lighthouse Act 1819 (59 Geo. 3. c. xxx)) relating thereto. (Repealed by Mersey Dock Acts Consolidation Act 1858 (21 & 22 Vict. c. xcii))
Wainfleet St. Mary Inclosure and Drainage Act 1825	6 Geo. 4. c. clxxxviii	27 June 1825
An Act to amend an Act of the Fifty third Year of His late Majesty, (Note: Wainfleet St. Mary Inclosure Act 1813 (53 Geo. 3. c. cci)) for embanking, inclosing and draining Lands in the Parish of Wainfleet Saint Mary, in the County of Lincoln.
Abingdon Improvement Act 1825 (repealed)	6 Geo. 4. c. clxxxix	27 June 1825
An Act for better paving lighting watching and otherwise improving the Town of Abingdon, in the County of Berks; for removing Nuisances, Annoyances, and Encroachments therein, and for preventing the same in future. (Repealed by Local Government Board's Provisional Orders Confirmation (No. 9) Act 1890 (53 & 54 Vict. c. clxxviii))
Newlands and Woodend Road (Glasgow) Act 1825	6 Geo. 4. c. cxc	27 June 1825
An Act for making and maintaining a Road from the Glasgow and Parkhead Road to Woodend, in the County of Lanark.
Road from Glasgow to Redburn Bridge Act 1825 (repealed)	6 Geo. 4. c. cxci	27 June 1825
An Act for making and maintaining the Road from Glasgow to Redburn Bridge, and certain other Roads in the Counties of Stirling, Dumbarton and Lanark. (Repealed by Road from Glasgow to Redburn Bridge Act 1842 (5 & 6 Vict. c. xxv))
New and Old Kilpatrick Road Act 1825	6 Geo. 4. c. cxcii	27 June 1825
An Act for more effectually amending and keeping in Repair the Road leading from or near the Church of New Kilpatrick, by Lawmuir, to the Town of Old Kilpatrick, in the County of Dumbarton.
Ulster Canal Act 1825	6 Geo. 4. c. cxciii	5 July 1825
An Act for making and maintaining a navigable Canal from Lough Erne, in the County of Fermanagh, to the River Blackwater, near the Village of Charlemont, in the County of Armagh.
Paisley Water Act 1825	6 Geo. 4. c. cxciv	5 July 1825
An Act for the better supplying the Town of Paisley, in the County of Renfrew, with Water.
St. Dunstan in the East Parish Borrowing Act 1825	6 Geo. 4. c. cxcv	5 July 1825
An Act to enable the Rector, Churchwardens and Inhabitants of the Parish of Saint Dunstan in the East, in the City of London, to borrow Money for paying off certain debts of the said Parish, and for other Purposes relating thereto.
Macclesfield Improvement Act 1825 (repealed)	6 Geo. 4. c. cxcvi	5 July 1825
An Act for better lighting, watching and improving the Borough and Township of Macclesfield, in the County of Chester, and regulating the Police thereof. (Repealed by Macclesfield Improvement Act 1852 (15 & 16 Vict. c. x))
West India Company Act 1825	6 Geo. 4. c. cxcvii	5 July 1825
An Act to enable the West India Company to sue in the Name or Names of the Chairman for the Time being, or of any other Member or Members of the Company, and for other Purposes.
Imperial Mining Company of Ireland Act 1825	6 Geo. 4. c. cxcviii	5 July 1825
An Act to enable the Imperial Mining Company for Ireland to sue and be sued in the Name of their Secretary, or of One of the Members of the said Company.
English and Bristol Channels Ship Canal Act 1825	6 Geo. 4. c. cxcix	6 July 1825
An Act for making and maintaining a Canal for Ships and other Vessels, to commence at or near Seaton Bay, in the County of Devon, and terminating in the Bristol Channel, at or near Stolford, or Bridgewater Bay, in the County of Somerset; with several collateral Branches to communicate therewith.
Sidmouth Harbour Act 1825	6 Geo. 4. c. cc	6 July 1825
An Act for making and constructing a Harbour and other Works, in the Parish of Sidmouth, in the County of Devon.
Bristol Town Dues Act 1825 (repealed)	6 Geo. 4. c. cci	6 July 1825
An Act to enable the Mayor, Burgesses and Commonalty of the City of Bristol, to reduce, alter, modify and regulate certain Dues called Town Dues and Mayor's Dues, and for the charging and collecting thereof. (Repealed by Bristol Corporation Act 1961 (9 & 10 Eliz. 2. c. xliv))
Alliance Marine Assurance Company Act 1825 (repealed)	6 Geo. 4. c. ccii	6 July 1825
An Act for enabling the Alliance Marine Assurance Company to sue and be sued in the Name of the Chairman for the Time being, or of any other Member of the Company. (Repealed by Alliance Marine Assurance Company Act 1834 (4 & 5 Will. 4. c. xxxiv))

=== Private acts ===
Short title	Citation	Royal assent
Long title
Fladbury Inclosure Act 1825	6 Geo. 4. c. 1 Pr.	31 March 1825
An Act for dividing, allotting, and inclosing the Commons and Waste Lands within the Hamlet of Stock and Bradley, in the Parish of Fladbury, in the County of Worcester.
Weston Inclosure Act 1825	6 Geo. 4. c. 2 Pr.	31 March 1825
An Act for inclosing Lands in the Parish of Weston, in the County of Norfolk.
Southcot and Kepnal Down Inclosure Act 1825	6 Geo. 4. c. 3 Pr.	31 March 1825
An Act for dividing and allotting in Severalty the Open and Commonable Lands called Southcot and Kepnal Down, within the Manor of Southcot and Kepnal, in the Parish of Pewsey, in the County of Wilts.
Rowbottom's Estate Act 1825	6 Geo. 4. c. 4 Pr.	2 May 1825
An Act to enable the Trustees of the Settlement of Estates, in the County of Lancaster, settled upon Robert Robottom of Abram, in the said County, Esquire, and Ann his Wife, and their Issue, to grant Leases of Coal Mines of such Estates.
Powell's Estate Act 1825	6 Geo. 4. c. 5 Pr.	2 May 1825
An Act for vesting in new Trustees, upon and subject to the subsisting Trust, certain Lifehold Estates in Brewood, in the County of Stafford, which were vested in the Reverend John Henry Powell Clerk, deceased.
Hockering and Morton Inclosure Act 1825	6 Geo. 4. c. 6 Pr.	20 May 1825
An Act for inclosing Lands in the Parishes of Hockering and Morton, in the County of Norfolk.
Dearham Inclosure Act 1825	6 Geo. 4. c. 7 Pr.	20 May 1825
An Act for inclosing Lands within the Manor and Parish of Dearham, in the County of Cumberland.
Carsington Hill Inclosure Act 1825	6 Geo. 4. c. 8 Pr.	20 May 1825
An Act for dividing, allotting and inclosing a certain stinted Pasture called Carsington Hill, in the Parish of Carsington, in the County of Derby.
Frampton Cotterell Inclosure Act 1825	6 Geo. 4. c. 9 Pr.	20 May 1825
An Act for inclosing certain Lands in the Parish of Frampton Cotterell, in the County of Gloucester.
Garford Inclosure Act 1825	6 Geo. 4. c. 10 Pr.	20 May 1825
An Act for dividing and allotting Lands in the Township or Hamlet of Garford, in the Parish of Marcham, in the County of Berks.
Becca and Aberford Inclosure Act 1825	6 Geo. 4. c. 11 Pr.	20 May 1825
An Act for inclosing certain Commons or Moors and Waste Lands within the Manors of Becca and Aberford, in the Parish of Aberford, in the West Riding of the County of York.
Glooston and Cranoe Inclosure etc. Act 1825	6 Geo. 4. c. 12 Pr.	20 May 1825
An Act for inclosing and exonerating from Tithes Lands in the Parishes of Glooston and Cranoe, in the County of Leicester.
Unett's Estates Act 1825	6 Geo. 4. c. 13 Pr.	10 June 1825
An Act to amend explain and confirm an Act made and passed in the Fourth Year of the Reign of His present Majesty, intituled "An Act for effectuating an Exchange of an Estate, in the Parish of Stone, in the County of Stafford, (to which Ann Unett, an Infant, is entitled in Tail,) for an Estate of greater Value, belonging to John Wilkes Unett and Elizabeth his Wife, and Lettice Unett." (Note: Unett Estates Act 1823 (4 Geo. 4. c. 15 Pr.))
MacGregor's Estate Act 1825	6 Geo. 4. c. 14 Pr.	10 June 1825
An Act for vesting the Lands and Estate of Ruskie, and certain other entailed Lands of Sir Evan John Murray McGregor of McGregor, Baronet, in Trustees, to be sold, and for laying out the Prices thereof in the Purchase of other Lands and Estates more conveniently situated, to be entailed under the Conditions and Limitations contained in Deeds of Entail executed by the late Sir John McGregor Murray Baronet.
Meyrick's Estate Act 1825	6 Geo. 4. c. 15 Pr.	10 June 1825
An Act for vesting the Fee of certain Settled Estates, late of Ann Elizabeth Meyrick, deceased, situate in the County of York, in Trustees, upon Trust to complete Sales made and to be made thereof, with the Approbation of the High Court of Chancery.
Honourable George Cadogan's and others' Estates Act 1825	6 Geo. 4. c. 16 Pr.	10 June 1825
An Act to enable the Honourable George Cadogan and others, to grant Building and Repairing Leases of Estates, in the Parish of Saint Luke Chelsea, in the County of Middlesex, and for other Purposes.
Earl Cadogan's Estate Act 1825	6 Geo. 4. c. 17 Pr.	10 June 1825
An Act to enable the Trustees of the Settled Estates of the Right Honourable Charles Henry Cadogan, Earl Cadogan, a Lunatic, to pull down a Mansion House, in the Parish of Saint Luke Chelsea, in the County of Middlesex, Part of the said Settled Estates, and to sell the Materials thereof; and to enable the Committee or Committees for the Time being of the Estate of the said Earl Cadogan, and the other Persons therein mentioned, to grant Building Leases of the Site of the said Mansion House, and its Offices and Appurtenances, and for other Purposes.
Chelsea Rectory Estate Act 1825	6 Geo. 4. c. 18 Pr.	10 June 1825
An Act for enabling the Rector of the Rectory and Parish Church of Chelsea, in the Parish of Saint Luke Chelsea, in the County of Middlesex, to grant Building and Repairing Leases of Glebe Lands and Premises belonging to the said Rectory, and for other Purposes.
Earl of Hopetoun's and James Dundas's Estates Act 1825	6 Geo. 4. c. 19 Pr.	10 June 1825
An Act for exchanging Part of the Entailed Lands and Estate of the Right Honourable John Earl of Hopetoun, situated in the County of Linlithgow, in Scotland, for Part of the Entailed Lands and Estate of James Dundas Esquire of Dundas, also situated in the said County of Linlithgow.
Clowes's Estate Act 1825	6 Geo. 4. c. 20 Pr.	10 June 1825
An Act for enabling the Trustees in the Will of Dorothy Clowes Widow, deceased, to grant Leases of Part of the Estates thereby devised, for building upon or improving the same.
Wilton, Burcombe, Netherhampton and Fugglestone St. Peter (Wiltshire) Inclosure Act 1825	6 Geo. 4. c. 21 Pr.	10 June 1825
An Act for dividing, allotting and inclosing Lands in the Parishes of Wilton, Burcomb, Netherhampton and Fugglestone Saint Peter, in the County of Wilts.
Cockerham Inclosure Act 1825	6 Geo. 4. c. 22 Pr.	10 June 1825
An Act to commute for a Corn Rent the Tithes and Dues payable to the Vicar of the Parish and Parish Church of Cockerham, in the County of Lancaster.
West Ilsley Inclosure Act 1825	6 Geo. 4. c. 23 Pr.	10 June 1825
An Act for dividing, allotting and laying in Severalty Lands in the Parish of West Ilsley, in the County of Berks.
Winterbourne Inclosure Act 1825	6 Geo. 4. c. 24 Pr.	10 June 1825
An Act for inclosing Lands in the Parish of Winterbourne in the County of Gloucester.
Orsett Inclosure Act 1825	6 Geo. 4. c. 25 Pr.	10 June 1825
An Act for dividing and inclosing and reducing to a Stint, and improving certain uninclosed Commons and Waste Grounds and Fens, within the Manor and Parish of Orsett, in the County of Essex.
Upper or East Santon (Lincolnshire) Inclosure etc. Act 1825	6 Geo. 4. c. 26 Pr.	10 June 1825
An Act for inclosing and exonerating from Tithes Lands in the Hamlet of East Santon, otherwise Upper Santon, in the Parish of Appleby, in the County of Lincoln.
Earl of Radnor's Estate Act 1825	6 Geo. 4. c. 27 Pr.	22 June 1825
An Act to enable Building Leases to be granted of Part of the Settled Estates of Jacob Earl of Radnor, in the Parish of Folkestone, and in the Liberty of the Town of Folkestone, and in the Parish of Cheriton, in the County of Kent, and in the Precinct of White Friars, and in the Parish of Saint Dunstan in the West, in the City of London.
Lauder's Estate Act 1825	6 Geo. 4. c. 28 Pr.	22 June 1825
An Act to enable Sir Thomas Dick Lauder Baronet, and the Heirs of Entail succeeding to him in the Estate of Grange, to grant Feus thereof upon certain Terms and Conditions.
Palk's Estate Act 1825	6 Geo. 4. c. 29 Pr.	22 June 1825
An Act for establishing certain Leases granted by Sir Lawrence Vaughan Palk Baronet, of certain Parts of the Manor of Tormohun, otherwise Tormoham, otherwise Tormoone, otherwise Tormoun, in the County of Devon, Parcel of his Settled Estates, and for enabling him to grant Leases of other Parts of the said Manor; and for other Purposes therein mentioned.
Caldcleugh's Estate Act 1825	6 Geo. 4. c. 30 Pr.	22 June 1825
An Act to enable the Trustees under the Will of Alexander Caldcleugh Esquire, deceased, to grant Building Leases of Lands, in the Parish of Croydon, in the County of Surrey.
Davidson's Estate Act 1825	6 Geo. 4. c. 31 Pr.	22 June 1825
An Act for vesting certain Parts of the Lands and Barony of Hatton, comprised in a Deed of Entail made by the Trustees of William Davidson Esquire, deceased, in Trustees to sell the same, and to apply the Purchase Money arising by such Sale in the Acquisition of other Estates to be settled upon the same Series of Heirs, and under the Conditions and Limitations contained in the said Deed of Entail; for granting Power to feu certain other Lands comprised in the said Deed of Entail, and certain Parts of the Lands and Barony of Muirhouse, which were entailed by the said William Davidson.
Earl Harcourt's Estate Act 1825	6 Geo. 4. c. 32 Pr.	22 June 1825
An Act for enabling the Devisees under the Will of the Right Honourable George Simon, late Earl Harcourt, to grant a Building and Repairing Lease of Harcourt House and Grounds, in Cavendish Square, in the County of Middlesex.
Marquis of Queensberry's Estate Act 1825	6 Geo. 4. c. 33 Pr.	22 June 1825
An Act to empower the Judges of the Court of Session to take an Account of the Debts and Burdens affecting and that may be made to affect the Entailed Estates of Charles Marquis of Queensberry in the County of Dumfries, and to sell such Part of the said Entailed Estates as shall be sufficient to discharge the said Debts and Burdens.
Inge's Estate Act 1825	6 Geo. 4. c. 34 Pr.	27 June 1825
An Act to establish certain Leases granted by Henrietta Inge Widow and William Inge Esquire, both deceased, of Houses and Lands in the Parish of Birmingham, in the County of Warwick.
Knapp's Estate Act 1825	6 Geo. 4. c. 35 Pr.	27 June 1825
An Act for vesting the Estates of John Knapp, deceased, in Trustees to be sold for Payment of Mortgages and other Debts, and applying the Surplus for the Benefit of his Widow, and his Infant Heir at Law.
Tate's Estate Act 1825	6 Geo. 4. c. 36 Pr.	27 June 1825
An Act for enabling Miss Mary Tate and others to grant Building and Repairing Leases of Lands and Premises, in the Parish of Saint Luke Chelsea, in the County of Middlesex, and for other Purposes.
Wyrley Birch and Eton College Estates Act 1825	6 Geo. 4. c. 37 Pr.	27 June 1825
An Act for effecting an Exchange of Estates, in the County of Norfolk, between Wyrley Birch Esquire, and the Provost and College of Eton, in the County of Bucks.
Cator's Estate Act 1825	6 Geo. 4. c. 38 Pr.	27 June 1825
An Act to enable John Cator, Esquire, to grant Building Leases of Lands in the Counties of Kent, Surrey, Essex and Hereford; and also for vesting in Trustees for Sale Part of the Estates in the said Counties devised by the Will of John Cator Esquire, deceased, and for laying out the Money arising from such Sales respectively, under the Direction of the High Court of Chancery, in the Purchase of other Estates to be settled to the same Uses; and for other Purposes.
Fowler's Estate Act 1825	6 Geo. 4. c. 39 Pr.	27 June 1825
An Act to enable the Trustees of Daniel Fowler Esquire, and Mary Ann his Wife, and their Children, to make Grants and Leases of Lands and Grounds in Camberwell Grove, Surrey, for the Purpose of having the same improved by Buildings, and to sell the reserved Rents and Reversion so as to produce a Fund to be held on the same Trusts as the Sum of Six thousand Pounds Three per Cent. Annuities originally settled; and also to appoint a new Trustee in the Place of William Fowler Esquire, a Lunatic, and of Mr. Robert Green, who is desirous of being discharged from the Trust.
Sclater's Estate Act 1825	6 Geo. 4. c. 40 Pr.	27 June 1825
An Act for vesting Part of the Estates devised by the Will of Richard Sclater Esquire, deceased, in Trustees to be sold; and for laying out the Money arising by such Sale in the Purchase of other Estates, to be settled to the same Uses.
Markham's Estate Act 1825	6 Geo. 4. c. 41 Pr.	27 June 1825
An Act for enabling the Trustees of the Will of Matthew Markham, deceased, to contract for and grant Building Leases of his residuary Real Estates.
Bold, Fleetwood, and Hesketh Estates Act 1825	6 Geo. 4. c. 42 Pr.	5 July 1825
An Act for confirming certain Partitions and Exchanges made by Anna Maria Bold, Peter Patten Bold, and Mary Princess Sapieha, deceased, with Bold Fleetwood Hesketh, and Robert Hesketh Esquires, deceased, and a Partition agreed upon by Henry Bold Hoghton Esquire, and Dorothea his Wife, with Peter Hesketh Esquire, of Lands and Tenements, in the Parish of North Meols, in the County Palatine of Lancaster.
Romilly's Estate Act 1825	6 Geo. 4. c. 43 Pr.	5 July 1825
An Act to extend the Powers and Provisions of an Act of the Fourth Year of the Reign of His Majesty King George the Fourth intituled "An Act for authorizing the Investment of Monies belonging to the Infant Sons of Sir Samuel Romilly, deceased, in the Purchase of certain Parts of his Daughter's Share of his Real Estate, to be conveyed to Trustees upon certain Trusts." (Note: Sir Samuel Romilly's Infant Sons' Estate Act 1823 (4 Geo. 4. c. 22 Pr.))
Leitch's Blind Asylum Act 1825 (repealed)	6 Geo. 4. c. 44 Pr.	5 July 1825
An Act for modifying and extending the Purposes of certain Deeds of Settlement of John Leitch Esquire, deceased; and for establishing an Asylum for the Blind in the City of Glasgow. (Repealed by South West of Scotland Blind Asylum Order Confirmation Act 1923 (13 & 14 Geo. 5. c. l))
Bishop of London's (Paddington) Estate Act 1825	6 Geo. 4. c. 45 Pr.	5 July 1825
An Act to enlarge the Powers of several Acts passed in the Thirty fifth, (Note: Bishop of London's (Paddington) Estate Act 1795 (35 Geo. 3. c. 83 Pr.)) Forty fourth, (Note: Bishop of London's (Paddington) Estate Act 1804 (44 Geo. 3. c. 63 Pr.)) Forty fifth, (Note: Bishop of London's (Paddington) Estate Act 1805 (45 Geo. 3. c. cxiii)) and Forty eighth (Note: Bishop of London's (Paddington) Estate Act 1808 (48 Geo. 3. c. cxlii)) Years of the Reign of His late Majesty King George the Third, for enabling the Lord Bishop of London to grant a Lease, with Powers of Renewal, of Lands, in the Parish of Paddington, in the County of Middlesex, for the Purpose of building upon, and to appoint new Trustees, and for other Purposes relating thereto.
St. Thomas's Hospital Estate Act 1825	6 Geo. 4. c. 46 Pr.	5 July 1825
An Act for confirming certain Leases granted by the Mayor, Commonalty and Citizens of the City of London, Governors of the Possessions, Revenues and Goods of the Hospital of King Edward the Sixth, called The Hospital of Saint Thomas the Apostle, and for enabling them to grant Building Leases of certain Lands.
See of Canterbury's Estate Act 1825	6 Geo. 4. c. 47 Pr.	5 July 1825
An Act for enabling the Archbishop of Canterbury and his Successors, to grant Licences for building upon and improving the Copyholds within the Manors of Lambeth and Croydon, in the County of Surrey and to grant Licences to demise such Copyholds for those Purposes, and to fix the Fines pay able upon Admission to the same during limited Periods.
Christ's Hospital Estate Act 1825	6 Geo. 4. c. 48 Pr.	5 July 1825
An Act for confirming certain Leases granted by the Mayor and Commonalty and Citizens of the City of London, Governors of the Possessions, Revenues and Goods of the Hospital of King Edward the Sixth, called Christ's Hospital, and for enabling them to grant Building Leases of certain Lands.
Bridewell Hospital Estate Act 1825 (repealed)	6 Geo. 4. c. 49 Pr.	5 July 1825
An Act for confirming certain Leases granted by the Mayor and Commonalty and Citizens of the City of London, Governors of the Possessions, Revenues and Goods of the Hospital of King Edward the Sixth, called Bridewell, and for enabling them to grant Leases of the Possessions of the said Hospital for long Terms of Years, for the Purposes herein mentioned (Repealed by Bridewell Hospital Act 1901 (1 Edw. 7. c. cxcix))
Bethlem Hospital Estate Act 1825	6 Geo. 4. c. 50 Pr.	5 July 1825
An Act for confirming certain Leases granted by the Mayor, and Commonalty and Citizens of the City of London, Masters, Guardians and Governors of the House and Hospital called Bethlem, and for enabling them to grant Building Leases certain Lands, the Possessions of the said Hospital for long Terms of Years, for the Purposes herein mentioned.
St. Bartholomew's Hospital Estate Act 1825	6 Geo. 4. c. 51 Pr.	5 July 1825
An Act for confirming certain Leases granted by the Mayor and Commonalty and Citizens of the City of London, Governors of the House of the Poor, commonly called Saint Bartholomew's Hospital, near West Smithfield, London, of the Foundation of King Henry the Eighth, and enabling them to grant Leases of the Possessions of the said Hospital for long Terms of Years for the Purposes herein mentioned.
Banks's Estate Act 1825	6 Geo. 4. c. 52 Pr.	5 July 1825
An Act for vesting the Estates devised by the Will of John Banks Esquire, deceased, in Trustees, in Trust to sell the same, and to lay out the Money arising from such Sale in the Purchase of other Estates.
Vernon's Estate Act 1825	6 Geo. 4. c. 53 Pr.	5 July 1825
An Act for enabling the Trustees appointed by the Will of John Vernon Esquire, deceased, to complete the Sales of certain Parts of the Estates thereby devised for the Purposes in the Act mentioned.
Baron Clinton and Saye's Estate Act 1825	6 Geo. 4. c. 54 Pr.	5 July 1825
An Act for vesting certain Settled Estates of the Right Honourable Robert Cotton Saint John Baron Clinton and Saye, in Trustees, to be sold for paying off Incumbrances, and for purchasing other Estates with the Residue of the Purchase Monies to be settled to the same Uses; and for amending an Act passed in the Third Year of the Reign of His present Majesty, (Note: Baron Clinton and Saye's Estate Act 1822 (3 Geo. 4. c. 35)) for vesting certain Estates of the said Baron Clinton in Trustees for Sale.
Marquis of Waterford's Estate Act 1825	6 Geo. 4. c. 55 Pr.	5 July 1825
An Act to enable the most Honourable Henry Marquis of Waterford to grant Leases of certain Estates in the Counties of Waterford, Kilkenny, Tipperary and Londonderry, in Ireland devised by the Will of the late George De la Poer Marquis of Waterford. deceased.
Waddington Hospital (Yorkshire) Act 1825	6 Geo. 4. c. 56 Pr.	5 July 1825
An Act for more effectually vesting the Estates of the Charity called Waddington Hospital, in the County of York, in the Trustees of the said Charity, and for enabling them to grant Leases of the said Estates for the Purposes of erecting or repairing Buildings, and also to sell Part of the said Estates, and to lay out the Monies arising thereby in the Purchase of other Estates, and for enlarging the Power given by the Founder to appoint new Trustees of the said Charity.
Duke of Norfolk's Estate Act 1825	6 Geo. 4. c. 57 Pr.	5 July 1825
An Act for vesting the Manor, Rectory and Isle of Hayling, in the County of Southampton, Part of the Settled Estates of the Duke of Norfolk, in William Padwick the younger, Esquire, his Heirs and Assigns, and for applying the Money thence arising in the Purchase of other Estates, to be settled to the same Uses and for other Purposes.
Isaac Bristow's Estate Act 1825	6 Geo. 4. c. 58 Pr.	5 July 1825
An Act for vesting certain Estates in the Parish of Greenwich, in the County of Kent, devised by the Will of the late Isaac Bristow, deceased, in Trustees for conveying the same to a Purchaser.
Northolt Inclosure Act 1825	6 Geo. 4. c. 59 Pr.	5 July 1825
An Act for inclosing Lands in the Parish of Northolt, otherwise Northall, otherwise Northaw, in the County of Middlesex.
Maubert's Naturalization Act 1825 (Note: This act was not printed by the King's Printer.)	6 Geo. 4. c. 60 Pr.	23 March 1825
An Act for naturalising John Francis Maubert.
Baring's Divorce Act 1825	6 Geo. 4. c. 61 Pr.	31 March 1825
An Act to dissolve the Marriage of Henry Baring Esquire, with Maria Matilda Baring his now Wife, and to enable him to marry again; and for other Purposes therein mentioned.
Graeme's Divorce Act 1825	6 Geo. 4. c. 62 Pr.	31 March 1825
An Act to dissolve the Marriage of Henry Sulivan Græme Esquire, with Anne Græme his now Wife, and to enable him to marry again; and for other the Purposes therein mentioned.
Benyon's Naturalization Act 1825	6 Geo. 4. c. 63 Pr.	2 May 1825
An Act for naturalizing Edward Richard Benyon Esquire.
Clenchwarton Inclosure Act 1825	6 Geo. 4. c. 64 Pr.	20 May 1825
An Act for inclosing certain Waste Lands within the Parish of Clenchwharton, in the County of Norfolk
Doddington, Wimblington, and Manea (Cambridgeshire) Inclosure Act 1825	6 Geo. 4. c. 65 Pr.	20 May 1825
An Act for inclosing Lands, in the Parish of Doddington and Hamlet of Wimblington, in the said Parish of Doddington and in the Hamlet of Manea, in the Parish of Coveney, in the Isle of Ely and County of Cambridge.
James Newport's Name Act 1825	6 Geo. 4. c. 66 Pr.	20 May 1825
An Act to enable James Wakeman Newport Esquire, and his First and other Sons, and their Issue Male, and his and their respective Children, to assume and use the Name and bear the Arms of Charlett, pursuant to the Will of Arthur Charlett Esquire, deceased.
Christchurch and Milton Inclosure Act 1825	6 Geo. 4. c. 67 Pr.	10 June 1825
An Act for dividing, allotting and inclosing a certain open and commonable Field, and Commons or Waste Lands, within the Parishes of Christchurch and Milton, in the County of Southampton.
Scrayingham Inclosure etc. Act 1825	6 Geo. 4. c. 68 Pr.	10 June 1825
An Act for inclosing Lands and extinguishing the Tithes within the Manor and Township of Scrayingham, in the County of York.
De Buck's Naturalization Act 1825	6 Geo. 4. c. 69 Pr.	10 June 1825
An Act for naturalizing Waynand John de Buck.
Clare College, Cambridge (Blyth's Benefaction) Act 1825 (repealed)	6 Geo. 4. c. 70 Pr.	22 June 1825
An Act to repeal an Act passed in the Third Year of King George the Third, (Note: Blyth's Benefaction Act 1763 (3 Geo. 3. c. 35 Pr.)) to enable the Master, Fellows and Scholars of Clare Hall, in the University of Cambridge, to vary the Benefaction of Doctor Blyth. (Repealed by Clare College Cambridge (Blythe's Benefaction) Act 1922 (12 & 13 Geo. 5. c. 1 Pr.))
St. Martin's Rectory, Birmingham Act 1825	6 Geo. 4. c. 71 Pr.	22 June 1825
An Act for authorizing the Sale of the Parsonage House Out Offices and Curtilage thereto adjoining, belonging to the Rectory of Saint Martin, in the Town of Birmingham, in the County of Warwick; and for applying the Purchase Money and granting Building Leases in Manner therein mentioned.
Nether Whitacre Inclosure Act 1825	6 Geo. 4. c. 72 Pr.	22 June 1825
An Act for inclosing Lands in the Manor of Nether Whitacre, in the County of Warwick.
Wiseman's Divorce Act 1825	6 Geo. 4. c. 73 Pr.	22 June 1825
An Act to dissolve the Marriage of Sir William Saltonstall Wiseman Baronet, with Katherine Wiseman his now Wife, and to enable him to marry again; and for other Purposes therein mentioned.
Peter's Divorce Act 1825	6 Geo. 4. c. 74 Pr.	22 June 1825
An Act to dissolve the Marriage of William Franklen Peter, with Jane Mary Margaret his now Wife, and to enable him to marry again; and for other Purposes.
Brandt's Naturalization Act 1825	6 Geo. 4. c. 75 Pr.	22 June 1825
An Act for naturalizing Emanuel Henry Brandt.
Van Wart's Naturalization Act 1825	6 Geo. 4. c. 76 Pr.	22 June 1825
An Act for naturalizing Henry Van Wart.
Moore's Divorce Act 1825	6 Geo. 4. c. 77 Pr.	27 June 1825
An Act to dissolve the Marriage of Maurice Crosbie Moore Esquire, with Diana Moore his now Wife, and to enable him to marry again; and for other Purposes therein mentioned.
Mathieu's Naturalization Act 1825	6 Geo. 4. c. 78 Pr.	27 June 1825
An Act for naturalizing Julien Mathieu.
White Ladies Aston Inclosure Act 1825	6 Geo. 4. c. 79 Pr.	5 July 1825
An Act for inclosing Lands, in the Parish of White Ladies Aston, in the County of Worcester.
Sullivan's Divorce Act 1825	6 Geo. 4. c. 80 Pr.	5 July 1825
An Act to dissolve the Marriage of John Augustus Sullivan, with Maria Holmes Sullivan his Wife, and to enable him to marry again; and for other Purposes therein mentioned.

=== Sources ===
- The Statutes of the United Kingdom of Great Britain and Ireland, 6 George IV. 1825. London: Joseph Butterworth. 1825 – via Google Books.
- Journal of the House of Commons. Vol. 80. London: His Majesty's Stationery Office. 3 February 1825. pp. 3–642 – via Internet Archive.
- Chronological Table of and Index to the Statutes. Vol. 1: To the End of the Session 59 Vict. Sess. 2 (1895) (13th ed.). London: Her Majesty's Stationery Office. 1896. pp. 242–246 – via Google Books.

== See also ==
- List of acts of the Parliament of the United Kingdom
