= List of acts of the Parliament of the United Kingdom from 1846 =

This is a complete list of acts of the Parliament of the United Kingdom for the year 1846.

Note that the first parliament of the United Kingdom was held in 1801; parliaments between 1707 and 1800 were either parliaments of Great Britain or of Ireland). For acts passed up until 1707, see the list of acts of the Parliament of England and the list of acts of the Parliament of Scotland. For acts passed from 1707 to 1800, see the list of acts of the Parliament of Great Britain. See also the list of acts of the Parliament of Ireland.

For acts of the devolved parliaments and assemblies in the United Kingdom, see the list of acts of the Scottish Parliament, the list of acts of the Northern Ireland Assembly, and the list of acts and measures of Senedd Cymru; see also the list of acts of the Parliament of Northern Ireland.

The number shown after each act's title is its chapter number. Acts passed before 1963 are cited using this number, preceded by the year(s) of the reign during which the relevant parliamentary session was held; thus the Union with Ireland Act 1800 is cited as "39 & 40 Geo. 3 c. 67", meaning the 67th act passed during the session that started in the 39th year of the reign of George III and which finished in the 40th year of that reign. Note that the modern convention is to use Arabic numerals in citations (thus "41 Geo. 3" rather than "41 Geo. III"). Acts of the last session of the Parliament of Great Britain and the first session of the Parliament of the United Kingdom are both cited as "41 Geo. 3".

Some of these acts have a short title. Some of these acts have never had a short title. Some of these acts have a short title given to them by later acts, such as by the Short Titles Act 1896.

== 9 & 10 Vict. ==
The sixth session of the 14th Parliament of the United Kingdom, which met from 22 January 1846 until 28 August 1846.

=== Public general acts ===
Short title	Citation	Royal assent
Long title
Public Works (Ireland) (No. 1) Act 1846 (repealed)	9 & 10 Vict. c. 1	5 March 1846
An Act for the further Amendment of the Acts for the Extension and Promotion of Public Works in Ireland. (Repealed by Statute Law Revision Act 1875 (38 & 39 Vict. c. 66), Statute Law Revision Act 1891 (54 & 55 Vict. c. 67), Public Works &c Loans Act (Northern Ireland) 1953 (c. 13 (N.I.)) and Statute Law Revision Act (Northern Ireland) 1954 (c. 35 (N.I.)))
County Works (Ireland) Act 1846 (repealed)	9 & 10 Vict. c. 2	5 March 1846
An Act to authorize Grand Juries in Ireland, at the Spring Assizes of the present Year, to appoint Extraordinary Presentment Sessions; to empower such Sessions to make Presentment for County Works, and to provide Funds for the Execution of such Works; and also to provide for the more prompt Payment of Contractors for Works under Grand Jury Presentments in Ireland. (Repealed by Payment of Wages Act (Northern Ireland) 1970 (c. 12 (N.I.)))
Fisheries (Ireland) Act 1846 (repealed)	9 & 10 Vict. c. 3	5 March 1846
An Act to encourage the Sea Fisheries of Ireland, by promoting and aiding with Grants of public Money the Construction of Piers, Harbours, and other Works. (Repealed by Harbours Act (Northern Ireland) 1970 (c. 1 (N.I.)))
Drainage (Ireland) Act 1846 (repealed)	9 & 10 Vict. c. 4	5 March 1846
An Act to amend the Acts for promoting the Drainage of Lands, and Improvement of Navigation and Water Power in connexion with such Drainage, in Ireland; and to afford Facilities for increased Employment for the labouring Classes in Works of Drainage during the present Year. (Repealed by Drainage and Improvement of Lands (Ireland) Act 1853 (16 & 17 Vict. c. 130), Statute Law Revision Act 1875 (38 & 39 Vict. c. 66), Statute Law Revision Act 1891 (54 & 55 Vict. c. 67) and Erne Drainage and Development Act (Northern Ireland) 1950 (c. 15 (N.I.)))
Metropolitan Buildings Act 1846 (repealed)	9 & 10 Vict. c. 5	24 March 1846
An Act to amend an Act for regulating the Construction and Use of Buildings in the Metropolis and its Neighbourhood. (Repealed by Metropolitan Building Act 1855 (18 & 19 Vict. c. 122))
Fever (Ireland) Act 1846 (repealed)	9 & 10 Vict. c. 6	24 March 1846
An Act to make Provision, until the First Day of September One thousand eight hundred and forty-seven, for the Treatment of poor Persons afflicted with Fever in Ireland. (Repealed by Statute Law Revision Act 1875 (38 & 39 Vict. c. 66))
Supply Act 1846 (repealed)	9 & 10 Vict. c. 7	30 March 1846
An Act to apply the Sum of Eight Millions out of the Consolidated Fund to the Service of the Year One thousand eight hundred and forty-six. (Repealed by Statute Law Revision Act 1875 (38 & 39 Vict. c. 66))
National Debt Act 1846 (repealed)	9 & 10 Vict. c. 8	30 March 1846
An Act to make further Provisions as to unclaimed Stock and Dividends of the South Sea Company. (Repealed by Statute Law Revision Act 1870 (33 & 34 Vict. c. 69))
Out-pensioners Services Act 1846 (repealed)	9 & 10 Vict. c. 9	2 April 1846
An Act for amending the Act for rendering effective the Services of the Chelsea Out-Pensioners, and extending it to the Out-Pensioners of Greenwich Hospital. (Repealed by Reserve Force Act 1867 (30 & 31 Vict. c. 110))
Out-pensioners Payment Act 1846 (repealed)	9 & 10 Vict. c. 10	2 April 1846
An Act for regulating the Payment of the Out-Pensioners of Greenwich and Chelsea Hospitals. (Repealed by Out-pensioners of Greenwich and Chelsea Hospitals Act 1856 (19 & 20 Vict. c. 15))
Mutiny Act 1846 (repealed)	9 & 10 Vict. c. 11	2 April 1846
An Act for punishing Mutiny and Desertion, and for the better Payment of the Army and their Quarters. (Repealed by Statute Law Revision Act 1875 (38 & 39 Vict. c. 66))
Marine Mutiny Act 1846 (repealed)	9 & 10 Vict. c. 12	2 April 1846
An Act for the Regulation of Her Majesty's Royal Marine Forces while on shore. (Repealed by Statute Law Revision Act 1875 (38 & 39 Vict. c. 66))
Indemnity Act 1846 (repealed)	9 & 10 Vict. c. 13	14 May 1846
An Act to indemnify such Persons in the United Kingdom as have omitted to qualify themselves for Offices and Employments, and to extend the Time limited for those purposes respectively until the Twenty-fifth Day of March One thousand eight hundred and forty-seven. (Repealed by Promissory Oaths Act 1871 (34 & 35 Vict. c. 48))
Insolvent Debtors (India) Act 1846 (repealed)	9 & 10 Vict. c. 14	14 May 1846
An Act to continue until the First Day of March One thousand eight hundred and forty-seven, and from thence to the End of the then next Session of Parliament, the several Acts relating to Insolvent Debtors in India. (Repealed by Indian Insolvency Act 1848 (11 & 12 Vict. c. 21))
Exchequer Bills Act 1846 (repealed)	9 & 10 Vict. c. 15	14 May 1846
An Act for raising the Sum of Eighteen millions three hundred and eighty thousand two hundred Pounds by Exchequer Bills, for the Service of the Year One thousand eight hundred and forty-six. (Repealed by Statute Law Revision Act 1875 (38 & 39 Vict. c. 66))
Annual Inclosure Act 1846	9 & 10 Vict. c. 16	14 May 1846
An Act to authorize the Inclosure of certain Lands, in pursuance of the Recommendation of the Inclosure Commissioners for England and Wales.
Burgh Trading Act 1846 or the Trading Within Burghs Act 1846	9 & 10 Vict. c. 17	14 May 1846
An Act for the Abolition of the exclusive Privilege of trading in Burghs in Scotland.
Print Works Act 1846 (repealed)	9 & 10 Vict. c. 18	18 June 1846
An Act to amend Two clerical Errors in an Act of the last Session, (Note: Print Works Act 1845 (8 & 9 Vict. c. 29)) for regulating the Labour of Children, young Persons, and Women in Print Works. (Repealed by Statute Law Revision Act 1875 (38 & 39 Vict. c. 66))
Parliamentary Elections (Ireland) Act 1846 (repealed)	9 & 10 Vict. c. 19	18 June 1846
An Act to amend an Act of the Second and Third Years of His late Majesty, by providing additional Booths or Polling Places at Elections in Ireland where the Number of Electors whose Names shall begin with the same Letter of the Alphabet shall exceed a certain Number. (Repealed by Ballot Act 1872 (35 & 36 Vict. c. 33))
Parliamentary Deposits Act 1846 (repealed)	9 & 10 Vict. c. 20	18 June 1846
An Act to amend an Act of the Second Year of Her present Majesty, for providing for the Custody of certain Monies paid, in pursuance of the Standing Orders of either House of Parliament, by Subscribers to Works or Undertakings to be effected under the Authority of Parliament. (Repealed by Statute Law Revision Act 1963 (c. 30))
Viscount Hardinge's Annuity Act 1846 (repealed)	9 & 10 Vict. c. 21	18 June 1846
An Act to enable the Right Honourable Henry Viscount Hardinge to receive the full Benefit of an Annuity of Five thousand Pounds granted to him by the East India Company. (Repealed by Statute Law Revision Act 1875 (38 & 39 Vict. c. 66))
Importation Act 1846 (repealed)	9 & 10 Vict. c. 22	26 June 1846
An Act to amend the Laws relating to the Importation of Corn. (Repealed by Statute Law Revision Act 1861 (24 & 25 Vict. c. 101))
Customs Act 1846 (repealed)	9 & 10 Vict. c. 23	26 June 1846
An Act to alter certain Duties of Customs. (Repealed by Customs Consolidation Act 1853 (16 & 17 Vict. c. 107))
Central Criminal Court Act 1846 (repealed)	9 & 10 Vict. c. 24	26 June 1846
An Act for removing some Defects in the Administration of Criminal Justice. (Repealed by Statute Law Revision Act 1891 (54 & 55 Vict. c. 67), Statute Law Revision Act 1892 (55 & 56 Vict. c. 19) and Criminal Law Act 1967 (c. 58))
Malicious Injuries by Fire, etc. Act 1846 (repealed)	9 & 10 Vict. c. 25	26 June 1846
An Act for preventing malicious Injuries to Persons and Property by Fire, or by explosive or destructive Substances. (Repealed by Criminal Statutes Repeal Act 1861 (24 & 25 Vict. c. 95))
Transportation Act 1846 (repealed)	9 & 10 Vict. c. 26	3 July 1846
An Act for abolishing the Office of Superintendent of Convicts under Sentence of Transportation. (Repealed by Statute Law Revision Act 1875 (38 & 39 Vict. c. 66))
Friendly Societies Act 1846 (repealed)	9 & 10 Vict. c. 27	3 July 1846
An Act to amend the Laws relating to Friendly Societies. (Repealed by Friendly Societies Act 1855 (18 & 19 Vict. c. 63))
Railway Companies Dissolution Act 1846 (repealed)	9 & 10 Vict. c. 28	3 July 1846
An Act to facilitate the Dissolution of certain Railway Companies. (Repealed by Companies Act 1862 (25 & 26 Vict. c. 89))
Sugar Duties (No. 1) Act 1846 (repealed)	9 & 10 Vict. c. 29	3 July 1846
An Act for granting to her Majesty, until the Fifty Day of August One thousand eight hundred and forty-six, certain Duties on Sugar imported into the United Kingdom. (Repealed by Sugar Duties (No. 3) Act 1846 (9 & 10 Vict. c. 63))
Parliamentary Elections Act 1846 (repealed)	9 & 10 Vict. c. 30	16 July 1846
An Act to define the Notice of Elections of Members to serve in Parliament for Cities, Towns, or Boroughs in Ireland. (Repealed by Elections (Ireland) Act 1862 (25 & 26 Vict. c. 92))
Annuity Lord Hardinge Act 1846 (repealed)	9 & 10 Vict. c. 31	27 July 1846
An act to settle an Annuity on Viscount Hardinge, and the Two next surviving Heirs Male of the Body of the said Viscount Hardinge to whom the Title of Viscount shall descend, in consideration of his great and brilliant Services. (Repealed by Statute Law Revision Act 1953 (2 & 3 Eliz. 2. c. 5))
Annuity, Lord Gough Act 1846 (repealed)	9 & 10 Vict. c. 32	27 July 1846
An Act to settle an annuity on Lord Gough, and the two next surviving heirs-male of the body of the said Lord Gough to whom the title of Lord Gough shall descend, in consideration of his important services. (Repealed by Statute Law Revision Act 1953 (2 & 3 Eliz. 2. c. 5))
Seditious Meeting Act 1846 (repealed)	9 & 10 Vict. c. 33	27 July 1846
An Act to amend the Laws relating to Corresponding Societies and the licensing of Lecture Rooms. (Repealed by Criminal Law Act 1967 (c. 58))
New Street from Spitalfields to Shoreditch Act 1846	9 & 10 Vict. c. 34	27 July 1846
An Act to enable the Commissioners of Her Majesty's Woods to construct a new Street from Spitalfields to Shoreditch. (Note: Commercial Street.)
Western Australia Government Act 1846 (repealed)	9 & 10 Vict. c. 35	27 July 1846
An Act to continue until the Thirty-first Day of December One thousand eight hundred and forty-eight, and to the End of the then next Session of Parliament, an Act of the Tenth Year of King George the Fourth, (Note: Government of Western Australia Act 1829 (10 Geo. 4 c. 22)) for providing for the Government of His Majesty's Settlements in Western Australia on the Western Coast of New Holland. (Repealed by Statute Law Revision Act 1875 (38 & 39 Vict. c. 66))
Coalwhippers (Port of London) Act 1846 (repealed)	9 & 10 Vict. c. 36	27 July 1846
An Act to continue until the First Day of January One thousand eight hundred and fifty-one, and to the End of the then next Session of Parliament, and to amend, an Act for establishing an Office for the Benefit of Coalwhippers of the Port of London. (Note: Port of London Coalwhippers Act 1843 (6 & 7 Vict. c. ci)) (Repealed by Statute Law Revision Act 1875 (38 & 39 Vict. c. 66))
Coroners (Ireland) Act 1846 (repealed)	9 & 10 Vict. c. 37	27 July 1846
An Act to amend the Laws relating to the Office of Coroner and the Expences of Inquests in Ireland. (Repealed by Coroners Act (Northern Ireland) 1959 (c. 15 (N.I.)))
Battersea Park Act 1846	9 & 10 Vict. c. 38	3 August 1846
An Act to empower the Commissioners of Her Majesty's Woods to form a Royal Park in Battersea Fields in the County of Surrey.
Battersea Bridge and Embankment, etc. Act 1846	9 & 10 Vict. c. 39	3 August 1846
An Act to enable the Commissioners of Her Majesty's Woods to construct an Embankment and Roadway on the North Shore of the River Thames from Battersea Bridge to Vauxhall Bridge, and to build a Suspension Bridge over the said River at or near Chelsea Hospital, with suitable Approaches thereto, including a Street from Lower Sloan Street to the Northern Extremity of the Bridge.
Ropeworks Act 1846 (repealed)	9 & 10 Vict. c. 40	3 August 1846
An Act to declare certain Ropeworks not within the Operation of the Factory Acts. (Repealed by Factory and Workshop Act 1878 (41 & 42 Vict. c. 16))
Sugar Duties (No. 2) Act 1846 (repealed)	9 & 10 Vict. c. 41	3 August 1846
An Act for granting to Her Majesty, until the Fifth Day of September One thousand eight hundred and forty-six, certain Duties on Sugar imported into the United Kingdom. (Repealed by Sugar Duties (No. 3) Act 1846 (9 & 10 Vict. c. 63))
New Zealand Company Act 1846 (repealed)	9 & 10 Vict. c. 42	3 August 1846
An Act to authorize a Loan from the Consolidated Fund to the New Zealand Company. (Repealed by Statute Law Revision Act 1875 (38 & 39 Vict. c. 66))
Militia Ballots Suspension Act 1846 (repealed)	9 & 10 Vict. c. 43	7 August 1846
An Act to suspend until the First Day of October One thousand eight hundred and forty-seven the making of Lists and the Ballots and Enrolments for the Militia of the United Kingdom. (Repealed by Statute Law Revision Act 1875 (38 & 39 Vict. c. 66))
Election of Members for Cheshire Act 1846 (repealed)	9 & 10 Vict. c. 44	7 August 1846
An Act to remove Doubts as to the Election of Members to serve in Parliament for the County of Chester, the Boroughs situate therein, and for the County of the City of Chester. (Repealed by Sheriffs Act 1887 (50 & 51 Vict. c. 55))
Newfoundland Constitution Act 1846 (repealed)	9 & 10 Vict. c. 45	7 August 1846
An Act to continue until the First Day of September One thousand eight hundred and forty-seven certain of the Provisions of an Act of the Fifth and Sixth Years of Her present Majesty, for amending the Constitution of the Government oi Newfoundland. (Repealed by Statute Law Revision Act 1875 (38 & 39 Vict. c. 66))
Ordnance Survey Act 1846 (repealed)	9 & 10 Vict. c. 46	7 August 1846
An Act to continue until the Thirty-first Day of December One thousand eight hundred and fifty-one an Act of the Fourth and Fifth Years of Her present Majesty, (Note: Ordnance Survey Act 1841 (4 & 5 Vict. c. 30)) for authorizing and facilitating the Completion of a Survey of Great Britain^ Berwick-upon-Tweed, and the Isle of Man. (Repealed by Statute Law Revision Act 1875 (38 & 39 Vict. c. 66))
Supply (No. 2) Act 1846 (repealed)	9 & 10 Vict. c. 47	13 August 1846
An Act to apply the Sum of Four Millions out of the Consolidated Fund, and the Surplus of Ways and Means, to the Service of the Year One thousand eight hundred and forty-six. (Repealed by Statute Law Revision Act 1875 (38 & 39 Vict. c. 66))
Art Unions Act 1846 (repealed)	9 & 10 Vict. c. 48	13 August 1846
An Act for legalizing Art Unions. (Repealed by Statute Law (Repeals) Act 2004 (c. 14))
Highway Rates Act 1846 (repealed)	9 & 10 Vict. c. 49	18 August 1846
An Act to continue until the First Day of October One thousand eight hundred and forty-seven, and to the End of the then next Session of Parliament, an Act for authorising the Application of Highway Rates to Turnpike Roads. (Note: Application of Highway Rates to Turnpikes Act 1841 (4 & 5 Vict. c. 59)) (Repealed by Statute Law Revision Act 1875 (38 & 39 Vict. c. 66))
Poor Rates Act 1846 (repealed)	9 & 10 Vict. c. 50	18 August 1846
An Act to continue until the First Day of October One thousand eight hundred and forty-seven, and to the End of the then Session of Parliament, the Exemption of Inhabitants of Parishes, Townships, and Villages from Liability to be rated as such, in respect of Stock in Trade or other Property, to the Relief of the Poor. (Repealed by Statute Law Revision Act 1875 (38 & 39 Vict. c. 66))
Turnpike Acts (Great Britain) Act 1846 (repealed)	9 & 10 Vict. c. 51	18 August 1846
An Act to continue certain Turnpike Acts until the First Day of October One thousand eight hundred and forty-seven, and to the End of the then next Session of Parliament. (Repealed by Statute Law Revision Act 1875 (38 & 39 Vict. c. 66))
Loan Societies Act 1846 (repealed)	9 & 10 Vict. c. 52	18 August 1846
An Act to continue to the First Day of October One thousand eight hundred and forty-seven, and to the End of the then next Session of Parliament, the Act to amend the Laws relating to Loan Societies. (Note: Loan Societies Act 1840 (3 & 4 Vict. c. 110)) (Repealed by Statute Law Revision Act 1875 (38 & 39 Vict. c. 66))
Copyhold Commission Act 1846 (repealed)	9 & 10 Vict. c. 53	18 August 1846
An Act to continue the Copyhold Commission until the Thirty-first Day of July One thousand eight hundred and forty-seven, and to the End of the then next Session of Parliament. (Repealed by Statute Law Revision Act 1875 (38 & 39 Vict. c. 66))
Practitioners in Common Pleas Act 1846 (repealed)	9 & 10 Vict. c. 54	18 August 1846
An Act to extend to all Barristers practising in the Superior Courts at Westminster the Privileges of Serjeants at Law in the Court of Common Pleas. (Repealed by Statute Law Revision Act 1875 (38 & 39 Vict. c. 66))
Militia Pay Act 1846 (repealed)	9 & 10 Vict. c. 55	18 August 1846
An Act to defray until the First Day of August One thousand eight hundred and forty-seven the Charge of the Pay, Clothing, and contingent and other Expences of the Disembodied Militia in Great Britain and Ireland; to grant Allowances in certain Cases to Subaltern Officers, Adjutants, Paymasters, Quartermasters, Surgeons, Assistant Surgeons, Surgeons Mates, and Serjeant Majors of the Militia; and to authorize the Employment of the Non-commissioned Officers. (Repealed by Statute Law Revision Act 1875 (38 & 39 Vict. c. 66))
Assessed Taxes and Income Tax Act 1846 (repealed)	9 & 10 Vict. c. 56	18 August 1846
An Act lo provide Forms of Proceedings under the Acts relating to the Duties of Assessed Taxes, and the Duties on Profits arising from Property, Professions, Trades, and Offices in England. (Repealed by Taxes Management Act 1880 (43 & 44 Vict. c. 19))
Railway Regulation (Gauge) Act 1846 or the Regulating the Gauge of Railways Act 1846 (repealed)	9 & 10 Vict. c. 57	18 August 1846
An Act for regulating the Gauge of Railways. (Repealed by Statute Law Revision Act 1959 (7 & 8 Eliz. 2. c. 68))
Customs (No. 2) Act 1846 (repealed)	9 & 10 Vict. c. 58	18 August 1846
An Act to amend an Act of the Seventh and Eighth Years of Her present Majesty, for reducing, under certain Circumstances, the Duties payable upon Books and Engravings. (Repealed by Statute Law Revision Act 1861 (24 & 25 Vict. c. 101))
Religious Disabilities Act 1846 (repealed)	9 & 10 Vict. c. 59	18 August 1846
An Act to relieve Her Majesty’s Subjects from certain Penalties and Disabilities in regard to Religious Opinions. (Repealed by Statute Law (Repeals) Act 1989 (c. 43))
Grand Jury Cess Act 1846 (repealed)	9 & 10 Vict. c. 60	18 August 1846
An Act to exempt from Stamp Duty Bonds and Warrants to confess Judgment executed by High Constables or Collectors of Grand Jury Cess, or their Sureties, in Ireland. (Repealed by Statute Law Revision Act 1875 (38 & 39 Vict. c. 66), Statute Law Revision Act 1891 (54 & 55 Vict. c. 67) and Finance Act (Northern Ireland) 1933 (c. 28 (N.I.)))
Prisons (Ireland) Act 1846 (repealed)	9 & 10 Vict. c. 61	18 August 1846
An Act to amend an Act of the Seventh Year of King George the Fourth (Note: Prisons (Ireland) Act 1826 (7 Geo. 4. c. 74)) for consolidating and amending the Laws relating to Prisons in Ireland. (Repealed by Statute Law Revision Act 1892 (55 & 56 Vict. c. 19))
Deodands Act 1846 (repealed)	9 & 10 Vict. c. 62	18 August 1846
An Act to abolish Deodands. (Repealed by Statute Law Revision Act 1875 (38 & 39 Vict. c. 66))
Sugar Duties (No. 3) Act 1846 (repealed)	9 & 10 Vict. c. 63	18 August 1846
An Act for granting certain Duties on Sugar and Molasses. (Repealed by Statute Law Revision Act 1861 (24 & 25 Vict. c. 101))
Interpleader (Ireland) Act 1846 (repealed)	9 & 10 Vict. c. 64	18 August 1846
An Act to enable Courts of Law in Ireland to give Relief against adverse Claims made upon Persons having no Interest in the Subject Matter of such Claims. (Repealed by Statute Law Revision Act 1892 (55 & 56 Vict. c. 19))
Stipendiary Magistrate (Staffordshire) Act 1846 (repealed)	9 & 10 Vict. c. 65	18 August 1846
An Act to provide for the more effectual Execution of the Office of a Justice of the Peace, and the better Administration of the Police, within the Borough of Wolverhampton and certain Parishes and Places in the Neighbourhood thereof, all in the County of Stafford. (Repealed by South Staffordshire Stipendiary Justice Act 1899 (62 & 63 Vict. c. xc))
Poor Removal Act 1846 (repealed)	9 & 10 Vict. c. 66	26 August 1846
An Act to amend the Laws relating to the Removal of the Poor. (Repealed by Poor Law Act 1927 (17 & 18 Geo. 5. c. 14))
Citations (Scotland) Act 1846	9 & 10 Vict. c. 67	26 August 1846
An Act to remove Doubts concerning Citations, and Services and Execution of Diligence, in Scotland.
Church Building (Burial Service in Chapels) Act 1846 (repealed)	9 & 10 Vict. c. 68	26 August 1846
An Act for better enabling the Burial Service to be performed in One Chapel where contiguous Burial Grounds shall have been provided for Two or more Parishes or Places. (Repealed by Isle of Man (Church Building and New Parishes) Act 1897 (60 & 61 Vict. c. 33), New Parishes Measure 1943 (6 & 7 Geo. 6. No. 1) and Statute Law (Repeals) Act 1974 (c. 22))
Naval Medical Supplemental Fund Society Act 1846 (repealed)	9 & 10 Vict. c. 69	26 August 1846
An Act to authorize until the Thirty-first Day of July One thousand eight hundred and forty-seven, and to the End of the then next Session of Parliament, the Regulation of the Annuities and Premiums of the Naval Medical Supplemental Fund Society. (Repealed by Statute Law Revision Act 1875 (38 & 39 Vict. c. 66))
Inclosure Act 1846	9 & 10 Vict. c. 70	26 August 1846
An Act to amend the Act to facilitate the Inclosure and Improvement of Commons.
County Works (Ireland) (No. 2) Act 1846 (repealed)	9 & 10 Vict. c. 71	26 August 1846
An Act to amend an Act of the present Session, intituled "An Act to authorize Grand Juries in Ireland, at the Spring Assizes of the present Year, to appoint Extraordinary Presentment Sessions; to empower such Sessions to make Presentments for County Works; and to provide Funds for the Execution of such Works; and also to provide for the more prompt Payment of Contractors for Works under Grand Jury Presentments in Ireland." (Note: County Works (Ireland) Act 1846 (9 & 10 Vict. c. 2)) (Repealed by Statute Law Revision Act 1875 (38 & 39 Vict. c. 66))
Marriages (Ireland) Act 1846	9 & 10 Vict. c. 72	26 August 1846
An Act to amend the Act for Marriages in Ireland, and for registering such Marriages.
Tithe Act 1846 (repealed)	9 & 10 Vict. c. 73	26 August 1846
An Act further to amend the Acts for the Commutation of Tithes in England and Wales. (Repealed by Statute Law (Repeals) Act 1998 (c. 43))
Baths and Washhouses Act 1846 or the Public Baths and Wash-houses Act 1846 (repealed)	9 & 10 Vict. c. 74	26 August 1846
An Act to encourage the Establishment of public Baths and Wash-houses. (Repealed by Public Health Act 1936 (26 Geo. 5 & 1 Edw. 8. c. 49), Public Health (London) Act 1936 (26 Geo. 5 & 1 Edw. 8. c. 50) and City of London (Various Powers) Act 1960 (8 & 9 Eliz. 2. c. xxxvi))
Joint Stock Banks (Scotland and Ireland) Act 1846 (repealed)	9 & 10 Vict. c. 75	26 August 1846
An Act to regulate Joint Stock Banks in Scotland and Ireland. (Repealed by Companies Act 1862 (25 & 26 Vict. c. 89))
Exclusive Trading (Ireland) Act 1846	9 & 10 Vict. c. 76	26 August 1846
An Act for the Abolition of the exclusive Privilege of Trading, or of regulating Trades, in Cities, Towns, or Boroughs in Ireland.
House of Commons Offices Act 1846 (repealed)	9 & 10 Vict. c. 77	26 August 1846
An Act to amend the Acta relating to the Offices of the House of Commons. (Repealed by House of Commons (Administration) Act 1978 (c. 36))
County Works (Ireland) (No. 3) Act 1846 (repealed)	9 & 10 Vict. c. 78	26 August 1846
An Act to authorize a further Advance of Money out of the Consolidated Fund towards defraying the Expence of County Works presented in Ireland. (Repealed by Statute Law Revision Act 1875 (38 & 39 Vict. c. 66))
Lunatic Asylums (Ireland) (No. 1) Act 1846 (repealed)	9 & 10 Vict. c. 79	26 August 1846
An Act to continue until the Thirty-first Day of July One thousand eight hundred and forty-seven, and to the End of the then Session of Parliament, an Act of the Fifth and Sixth Years of Her present Majesty, (Note: Private Lunatic Asylums (Ireland) Act 1842 (5 & 6 Vict. c. 123)) for amending the Law relative to Private Lunatic Asylums in Ireland. (Repealed by Statute Law Revision Act 1875 (38 & 39 Vict. c. 66))
Public Works Loans Act 1846 (repealed)	9 & 10 Vict. c. 80	26 August 1846
An Act to authorize the Advance of Money out of the Consolidated Fund, for carrying on Public Works and Fisheries, and Employment of the Poor. (Repealed by Statute Law Revision Act 1875 (38 & 39 Vict. c. 66))
Income Tax Act 1846 (repealed)	9 & 10 Vict. c. 81	26 August 1846
An Act for regulating the Deduction at the Bank of England of Income Tax Duty in respect of certain Offices. (Repealed by Court of Chancery (Funds) Act 1872 (35 & 36 Vict. c. 44))
New Zealand Company (No. 2) Act 1846 (repealed)	9 & 10 Vict. c. 82	26 August 1846
An Act to amend an Act of the present Session (Note: New Zealand Company Act 1846 (9 & 10 Vict. c. 42)) for authorizing a Loan from the Consolidated Fund to the New Zealand Company. (Repealed by Statute Law Revision Act 1875 (38 & 39 Vict. c. 66))
Public Works Loans (No. 2) Act 1846 (repealed)	9 & 10 Vict. c. 83	26 August 1846
An Act to empower the Commissioners for the Issue of Loans for Public Works and Fisheries to make Loans in Money to the Commissioners of Her Majesty's Woods, in lieu of Loans heretofore authorized to be made in Exchequer Bills. (Repealed by Statute Law Revision Act 1875 (38 & 39 Vict. c. 66))
Lunatic Asylums, etc. Act 1846 or the Lunacy Act 1846 (repealed)	9 & 10 Vict. c. 84	26 August 1846
An Act to amend the Law concerning Lunatic Asylums and the Care of Pauper Lunatics in England. (Repealed by Lunatic Asylums Act 1853 (16 & 17 Vict. c. 97))
Loans for Public Works (Ireland) Act 1846 (repealed)	9 & 10 Vict. c. 85	26 August 1846
An Act to authorize the Application of Money for the Purposes of Loans for carrying on Public Works in Ireland. (Repealed by Statute Law Revision Act 1875 (38 & 39 Vict. c. 66))
Public Works (Ireland) (No. 2) Act 1846 (repealed)	9 & 10 Vict. c. 86	26 August 1846
An Act to extend and consolidate the Powers hitherto exercised by the Commissioners of Public Works in Ireland, and to appoint additional Commissioners. (Repealed by Statute Law Revision Act 1875 (38 & 39 Vict. c. 66), Statute Law Revision Act 1891 (54 & 55 Vict. c. 67) and Public Works &c Loans Act (Northern Ireland) 1953 (c. 13 (N.I.)))
Baths and Washhouses (Ireland) Act 1846	9 & 10 Vict. c. 87	26 August 1846
An Act for promoting the voluntary Establishment in Boroughs and certain Cities and Towns in Ireland of public Baths and Wash-houses.
Church Patronage Act 1846 (repealed)	9 & 10 Vict. c. 88	26 August 1846
An Act to remove Doubts as to the Legality of certain Assignments of Ecclesiastical Patronage. (Repealed by Patronage (Benefices) Measure 1986 (No. 3))
Turnpike Roads (Ireland) Act 1846 (repealed)	9 & 10 Vict. c. 89	26 August 1846
An Act to continue certain Acts for regulating Turnpike Roads in Ireland until the Thirty-first Day of July One thousand eight hundred and forty-seven, and to the End of the then session of Parliament. (Repealed by Statute Law Revision Act 1875 (38 & 39 Vict. c. 66))
Still Licences Act 1846 (repealed)	9 & 10 Vict. c. 90	26 August 1846
An Act to prevent the Use of Stills by unlicensed Persons. (Repealed by Customs and Excise Act 1952 (15 & 16 Geo. 6 & 1 Eliz. 2. c. 44))
Crown Appointments (Colonies) Act 1846 (repealed)	9 & 10 Vict. c. 91	26 August 1846
An Act to continue certain Patent Commissions until the Exhibition of the Commissions revoking them. (Repealed by Colonial Letters Patent Act 1863 (26 & 27 Vict. c. 76))
Naval and Military Accounts Act 1846 (repealed)	9 & 10 Vict. c. 92	26 August 1846
An Act to provide for the Preparation, Audit, and Presentation to Parliament of annual Accounts of the Receipt and Expenditure of the Naval and Military Departments. (Repealed by Exchequer and Audit Departments Act 1866 (29 & 30 Vict. c. 39))
Fatal Accidents Act 1846 or Lord Campbell's Act (repealed)	9 & 10 Vict. c. 93	26 August 1846
An Act for compensating the Families of Persons killed by Accidents. (Repealed for England and Wales by Fatal Accidents Act 1976 (c. 30) and for Northern Ireland by Fatal Accidents (Northern Ireland) Order 1977 (SI 1977/1251))
Customs (No. 3) Act 1846 (repealed)	9 & 10 Vict. c. 94	28 August 1846
An Act to enable the Legislatures of certain British Possessions to reduce or repeal certain Duties of Customs. (Repealed by Statute Law Revision Act 1861 (24 & 25 Vict. c. 101))
County Courts Act 1846 or the County Courts (England) Act 1846 (repealed)	9 & 10 Vict. c. 95	28 August 1846
An Act for the more easy Recovery of Small Debts and Demands in England. (Repealed by County Courts Act 1888 (51 & 52 Vict. c. 43))
Nuisances Removal, etc. Act 1846 (repealed)	9 & 10 Vict. c. 96	28 August 1846
An Act for the more speedy Removal of certain Nuisances, and to enable the Privy Council to make Regulations for the Prevention of contagious and epidemic Diseases until the Thirty-first Day of August One thousand eight hundred and forty-seven, and to the End of the then next Session of Parliament. (Repealed by Statute Law Revision Act 1875 (38 & 39 Vict. c. 66))
Constabulary (Ireland) Act 1846 (repealed)	9 & 10 Vict. c. 97	28 August 1846
An Act to provide for removing the Charge of the Constabulary Force in Ireland from the Counties, and for enlarging the Reserve Force; and to make further Provision for the Regulation and Disposition of the said Constabulary Force. (Repealed by Statute Law Revision Act (Northern Ireland) 1954 (c. 35 (N.I.)))
Pawnbrokers Act 1846 (repealed)	9 & 10 Vict. c. 98	28 August 1846
An Act to amend the Law for regulating the Hours of receiving and delivering Goods and Chattels as Pawns in Pawnbrokers Shops. (Repealed by Pawnbrokers Act 1872 (35 & 36 Vict. c. 93))
Wreck and Salvage Act 1846 (repealed)	9 & 10 Vict. c. 99	28 August 1846
An Act for consolidating and amending the Laws relating to Wreck and Salvage. (Repealed by Merchant Shipping Repeal Act 1854 (17 & 18 Vict. c. 120))
Steam Navigation Act 1846 (repealed)	9 & 10 Vict. c. 100	28 August 1846
An Act for the Regulation of Steam Navigation, and for requiring Sea-going Vessels to carry Boats. (Repealed by Steam Navigation Act 1851 (14 & 15 Vict. c. 79))
Public Money Drainage Act 1846 (repealed)	9 & 10 Vict. c. 101	28 August 1846
An Act to authorize the Advance of Public Money to a limited Amount, to promote the Improvement of Land in Great Britain and Ireland by Works of Drainage. (Repealed by Statute Law Revision Act 1958 (6 & 7 Eliz. 2. c. 46))
Customs (No. 4) Act 1846 (repealed)	9 & 10 Vict. c. 102	28 August 1846
An Act to amend the Laws relating to the Customs. (Repealed by Customs Consolidation Act 1853 (16 & 17 Vict. c. 107))
Government of New Zealand Act 1846 or the New Zealand Constitution Act 1846 (repealed)	9 & 10 Vict. c. 103	28 August 1846
An Act to make further Provision for the Government of the New Zealand Islands. (Repealed by Statute Law Revision Act 1891 (54 & 55 Vict. c. 67))
Waste Lands (Australia) Act 1846 (repealed)	9 & 10 Vict. c. 104	28 August 1846
An Act to amend an Act (Note: Australian Colonies Waste Lands Act 1842 (5 & 6 Vict. c. 36)) for regulating the Sale of Waste Land belonging to the Crown in the Australian Colonies, and to make further Provision for the Management thereof. (Repealed by Australian Waste Lands Act 1855 (18 & 19 Vict. c. 56) (Note: Incorrectly cited as "18 & 19 Vict. c. 50" in the Chronological Table of the Statutes.))
Railways Commissioners Act 1846 (repealed)	9 & 10 Vict. c. 105	28 August 1846
An Act for constituting Commissioners of Railways. (Repealed by Railway Regulation Act 1851 (14 & 15 Vict. c. 64))
Local Acts (Preliminary Inquiries) Act 1846 (repealed)	9 & 10 Vict. c. 106	28 August 1846
An Act for making preliminary Inquiries in certain Cases of Application for Local Acts. (Repealed by Local Acts (Preliminary Inquiries) Act 1848 (11 & 12 Vict. c. 129))
Poor Employment (Ireland) Act 1846 (repealed)	9 & 10 Vict. c. 107	28 August 1846
An Act to facilitate the Employment of the labouring Poor for a limited Period in the distressed Districts in Ireland. (Repealed by Statute Law Revision Act 1875 (38 & 39 Vict. c. 66))
Loans for Public Works (Ireland) (No. 2) Act 1846 (repealed)	9 & 10 Vict. c. 108	28 August 1846
An Act to provide additional Funds for Loans and' Grants for Public Works in Ireland. (Repealed by Statute Law Revision Act 1875 (38 & 39 Vict. c. 66))
Public Works Advances (Ireland) Act 1846 (repealed)	9 & 10 Vict. c. 109	28 August 1846
An Act to authorize a further Issue of Money in aid of Public Works of acknowledged Utility in poor Districts in Ireland. (Repealed by Drainage, etc. (Ireland) Act 1847 (10 & 11 Vict. c. 106))
Rateable Property (Ireland) Act 1846 (repealed)	9 & 10 Vict. c. 110	28 August 1846
An Act to amend the Law relating to the Valuation of rateable Property in Ireland. (Repealed by Valuation (Ireland) Act 1852 (15 & 16 Vict. c. 63))
Ejectment and Distress (Ireland) Act 1846	9 & 10 Vict. c. 111	28 August 1846
An Act to amend the Law in Ireland as to Ejectments and Distresses, and as to the Occupation of Lands.
Leases (Ireland) Act 1846 (repealed)	9 & 10 Vict. c. 112	28 August 1846
An Act to facilitate and encourage the granting of certain Leases for Terms of Years in Ireland. (Repealed by Repeal of Unnecessary Laws Act (Northern Ireland) 1953 (c. 5 (N.I.)))
Prohibition and Mandamus (Ireland) Act 1846 (repealed)	9 & 10 Vict. c. 113	28 August 1846
An Act to improve the Proceedings in Prohibition and on Writ of Mandamus in Ireland. (Repealed by Statute Law Revision Act 1892 (55 & 56 Vict. c. 19))
Fisheries (Ireland) (No. 2) Act 1846 (repealed)	9 & 10 Vict. c. 114	28 August 1846
An Act for the further Amendment of an Act of the Sixth Year of Her present Majesty, (Note: Fisheries (Ireland) Act 1842 (5 & 6 Vict. c. 106)) for regulating the Irish Fisheries. (Repealed by Statute Law Revision Act 1875 (38 & 39 Vict. c. 66))
Lunatic Asylums (Ireland) Act 1846 (repealed)	9 & 10 Vict. c. 115	28 August 1846
An Act to amend the Laws as to District Lunatic Asylums in Ireland; to provide for the Expence of the Maintenance of certain Lunatic Poor removed from the Richmond Lunatic Asylum, Dublin, for Want of Room therein; and to provide for the Salaries and Expences incident to the Office of Inspector of Lunatics in Ireland. (Repealed by Statute Law Revision Act 1875 (38 & 39 Vict. c. 66), Health Services Act (Northern Ireland) 1948 (c. 3 (N.I.)) and Statute Law Revision Act (Northern Ireland) 1954 (c. 35 (N.I.)))
Appropriation Act 1846 (repealed)	9 & 10 Vict. c. 116	28 August 1846
An Act to apply the Sum of Eight millions three hundred fifty-six thousand one hundred and seventy-three Pounds Seventeen Shillings and Eleven-pence out of the Consolidated Fund, and Monies in the Exchequer, to the Service of the Year One thousand eight hundred and forty-six, and to appropriate the Supplies granted in this Session of Parliament. (Repealed by Statute Law Revision Act 1875 (38 & 39 Vict. c. 66))
Inclosures (No. 2) Act 1846	9 & 10 Vict. c. 117	26 August 1846
An Act to authorize the Inclosure of certain Lands pursuant to a special Report of the Inclosure Commissioners for England and Wales.

=== Local acts ===
Short title	Citation	Royal assent
Long title
Downpatrick Gas Act 1846	9 & 10 Vict. c. i	2 April 1846
An Act for lighting with Gas the Town of Downpatrick in the County of Down.
Radcliffe and Pilkington Gas Act 1846 (repealed)	9 & 10 Vict. c. ii	2 April 1846
An Act for lighting with Gas the Town and Parish of Radcliff and the Township of Pilkington, or Parts thereof, in the County Palatine of Lancaster. (Repealed by Radcliffe and Pilkington Gas Act 1854 (17 & 18 Vict. c. iii))
Aylesbury and Walton Rates Act 1846 (repealed)	9 & 10 Vict. c. iii	2 April 1846
An Act for better assessing and collecting the Poor Rates, Lighting and Watching and Church Rates, in the Parish of Aylesbury, and the Highway Bates in the Township of Aylesbury and Hamlet of Walton respectively, in the County of Buckingham. (Repealed by Statute Law (Repeals) Act 2008 (c. 12))
Bury Gas Act 1846 (repealed)	9 & 10 Vict. c. iv	14 May 1846
An Act for granting more effectual Powers for lighting with Gas the Town of Bury and the Neighbourhood thereof in the Parish of Bury in the County Palatine of Lancaster. (Repealed by Bury Gas Act 1857 (20 & 21 Vict. c. lxiii))
Ellesmere and Chester Canal Act 1846	9 & 10 Vict. c. v	14 May 1846
An Act to enable the United Company of Proprietors of the Ellesmere and Chester Canal to raise a further Sum of Money.
Rochester Bridge Act 1846 (repealed)	9 & 10 Vict. c. vi	14 May 1846
An Act for building a Bridge across the River Medway at Rochester in the County of Kent, with Approaches thereto; for taking down the present Bridge; and for amending the Acts relating to the same. (Repealed by Charities (The Rochester Bridge Trust) Order 2000 (SI 2000/3098))
Woodstock and Rollright Lane Road (Oxfordshire) Act 1846 (repealed)	9 & 10 Vict. c. vii	14 May 1846
An Act for repairing, improving, and maintaining certain Roads leading from the Borough of New Woodstock to Rollright Lane, and other Roads connected therewith, in the County of Oxford. (Repealed by Statute Law (Repeals) Act 2013 (c. 2))
Middleton Gas Company Act 1846 (repealed)	9 & 10 Vict. c. viii	14 May 1846
An Act for lighting with Gas the Town of Middleton and its Vicinity in the County of Lancaster. (Repealed by Middleton Gas Act 1854 (17 & 18 Vict. c. i))
Willingham Inclosure and Drainage Act 1846	9 & 10 Vict. c. ix	14 May 1846
An Act for inclosing Lands in the Parish of Willingham in the County of Cambridge, and for draining and embanking certain Fen Lands and Low Grounds in the said Parish.
Manchester and Salford Waterworks Act 1846	9 & 10 Vict. c. x	14 May 1846
An Act to enable the Company of Proprietors of the Manchester and Salford Waterworks to raise a further Sum of Money.
Monkland Navigation Act 1846	9 & 10 Vict. c. xi	14 May 1846
An Act for altering, amending, and enlarging the Powers and Provisions of the several Acts passed in relation to the Monkland Navigation.
Enfield Chase Road Amendment Act 1846	9 & 10 Vict. c. xii	14 May 1846
An Act for enabling the Trustees of the Enfield Chase Road to make a Deviation or Alteration of the said Road from a Point near the Sixteenth Milestone in the Parish of North Mims to the Town of Hatfield in the County of Hertford.
Sunderland Dock Act 1846 (repealed)	9 & 10 Vict. c. xiii	14 May 1846
An Act for constructing a Wet Dock and other Works on the South Side of the River Wear at Sunderland-near-the-Sea in the County Palatine of Durham. (Repealed by Sunderland Dock Act 1855 (18 & 19 Vict. c. cxxviii))
Great Western Railway Act 1846	9 & 10 Vict. c. xiv	14 May 1846
An Act to amend and enlarge some of the Provisions of the Acts relating to the Great Western Railway Company, and to confirm the Purchase of certain Railways by the said Company.
Taunton Gas Act 1846	9 & 10 Vict. c. xv	14 May 1846
An Act for enabling the Taunton Gas Light and Coke Company, incorporated by the Taunton Gas Act, 1845, (Note: Taunton Gas Act 1845 (8 & 9 Vict. c. lxvii)) to borrow additional Money, for the Purposes of the Company, and for confirming a Purchase made by them; and for other Purposes.
Helensburgh Harbour Act 1846	9 & 10 Vict. c. xvi	14 May 1846
An Act for improving and maintaining the Port and Harbour of Helensburgh in the County of Dumbarton.
York New Waterworks Act 1846	9 & 10 Vict. c. xvii	14 May 1846
An Act for better supplying with Water the City and Neighbourhood of York.
Most Honourable and Loyal Society of Ancient Britons Act 1846	9 & 10 Vict. c. xviii	14 May 1846
An Act to incorporate the Members of the Most Honourable and Loyal Society of Ancient Britons, commonly called The Welsh Charity School, and to enable them the better to carry on their charitable Designs.
Boston Waterworks Act 1846	9 & 10 Vict. c. xix	14 May 1846
An Act for better supplying with Water the Town and Environs of Boston in the County of Lincoln.
Birmingham Cemetery Act 1846	9 & 10 Vict. c. xx	14 May 1846
An Act for establishing a Cemetery at Birmingham in the County of Warwick.
Glasgow Waterworks Act 1846	9 & 10 Vict. c. xxi	14 May 1846
An Act to enable the Company of Proprietors of the Glasgow Waterworks to introduce an additional Supply of Water to the City and Suburbs of Glasgow.
City of London Coal Market and Improvement Act 1846 (repealed)	9 & 10 Vict. c. xxii	18 June 1846
An Act for providing an enlarged Site for rebuilding the Coal Market in the City of London, and for widening the Avenues in the Vicinity thereof, and for effecting other improvements in the said City. (Repealed by City of London (Various Powers) Act 1967 (c. xlii))
Glasgow Harbour Act 1846 (repealed)	9 & 10 Vict. c. xxiii	18 June 1846
An Act for enabling the Parliamentary Trustees on the River Clyde and Harbour of Glasgow to acquire a Portion of the Lands of Stobcross and adjacent Grounds, and to construct thereon a Wet Dock or Tidal Basin, with certain additional Wharfs and other Works. (Repealed by Clyde Navigation Consolidation Act 1858 (21 & 22 Vict. c. cxlix))
Sligo Harbour Act 1846	9 & 10 Vict. c. xxiv	18 June 1846
An Act for improving and maintaining the Harbour or Port of Sligo in the County of Sligo.
Weston-super-Mare Pier Act 1846	9 & 10 Vict. c. xxv	18 June 1846
An Act for constructing a Pier, and forming necessary Approaches thereto, in the Parish of Weston-super-Mare in the County of Somerset.
Southampton Harbour Act 1846 (repealed)	9 & 10 Vict. c. xxvi	18 June 1846
An Act for amending certain Acts of the Forty-third (Note: Southampton Harbour Act 1803 (43 Geo. 3. c. xxi)) and Fiftieth (Note: Southampton Port Improvement Act 1810 (50 Geo. 3. c. clxviii)) Years of the Reign of His late Majesty King George the Third, relating to the Port and Harbour of the Town and County of the Town of Southampton. (Repealed by Southampton Harbour Act 1863 (26 & 27 Vict. c. cxix))
Plymouth, Devonport and Stonehouse Cemetery Company Act 1846	9 & 10 Vict. c. xxvii	18 June 1846
An Act for establishing a general Cemetery for the Interment of the Dead in the Neighbourhood of the Towns of Plymouth, Devonport, and Stonehouse, in the County of Devon.
Birkenhead, Claughton-cum-Grange and Oxton Improvement Act 1846 (repealed)	9 & 10 Vict. c. xxviii	18 June 1846
An Act for altering, amending, and enlarging the several Acts relating to the Improvement of Birkenhead, Claughton-cum-Grange, and Part of Oxton, in the County of Chester. (Repealed by Birkenhead Corporation Act 1881 (44 & 45 Vict. c. cliii))
Leicester Improvement Act 1846 (repealed)	9 & 10 Vict. c. xxix	18 June 1846
An Act for improving the Borough of Leicester. (Repealed by Leicester (Amendment of Local Enactments) Order 1959 (SI 1959/785))
Southport Improvement Act 1846 (repealed)	9 & 10 Vict. c. xxx	18 June 1846
An Act for paving, lighting, watching, watering, cleansing, regulating, and otherwise improving the Town of Southport, in the County Palatine of Lancaster, and for establishing and regulating a Market and Market Places therein. (Repealed by Southport Improvement Act 1865 (28 & 29 Vict. c. cxcv))
Helensburgh Extension and Improvement Act 1846	9 & 10 Vict. c. xxxi	18 June 1846
An Act for extending the Limits of the Burgh of Helensburgh in the County of Dumbarton, for lighting and cleansing the same, for establishing a Police therein, and for other Purposes relating thereto.
Old and New Monkland, Bothwell and Shotts Police District Act 1846	9 & 10 Vict. c. xxxii	18 June 1846
An Act to erect and constitute the Parishes of Old and New Monkland, and Parts of the Parishes of Bothwell and Shotts, in the County of Lanark, into One Police District, for the Establishment of an efficient Police Force therein, and for other Purposes relating thereto.
Gravesend and Milton Waterworks Act 1846	9 & 10 Vict. c. xxxiii	18 June 1846
An Act for incorporating the Gravesend and Milton Waterworks Company, and for more effectually supplying the Inhabitants of the Town and Parishes of Gravesend and Milton-next-Gravesend and the Parish of Northfleet in the County of Kent with Water.
Bury Waterworks Act 1846	9 & 10 Vict. c. xxxiv	18 June 1846
An Act for granting more effectual Powers for supplying with Water the Town of Bury, and the several Townships of Walmersley-cum-Shuttleworth, Bury, and Elton, all in the Parish of Bury in the County Palatine of Lancaster.
Liverpool and Harrington Waterworks Act 1846 (repealed)	9 & 10 Vict. c. xxxv	18 June 1846
An Act to amend the Provisions of Two several Acts passed in the Third (Note: Liverpool Water Act 1822 (3 Geo. 4. c. lxxvii)) and Eighth (Note: Harrington and Toxteth Park Water Act 1827 (7 & 8 Geo. 4. c. xxxvi)) Years of His Majesty King George the Fourth, for supplying with Water the Town of Liverpool and Harrington and Toxteth Park in the County Palatine of Lancaster. (Repealed by Liverpool Corporation Act 1921 (11 & 12 Geo. 5. c. lxxiv))
Sunderland Waterworks Act 1846 (repealed)	9 & 10 Vict. c. xxxvi	18 June 1846
An Act for better supplying with Water the Town and Borough of Sunderland, and the Neighbourhood thereof, in the County of Durham. (Repealed by Sunderland and South Shields Waterworks Act 1852 (15 & 16 Vict. c. xxvii))
Sunderland Gas Act 1846 (repealed)	9 & 10 Vict. c. xxxvii	18 June 1846
An Act for better supplying with Gas the Town and Borough of Sunderland, and the Neighbourhood thereof, in the County of Durham. (Repealed by Sunderland Gas Act 1857 (20 & 21 Vict. c. vii))
Rotherham Gas Act 1846 (repealed)	9 & 10 Vict. c. xxxviii	18 June 1846
An Act for incorporating the Rotherham Gas Light and Coke Company, and for better supplying the Parish of Rotherham in the West Riding of the County of York with Gas. (Repealed by Rotherham Gaslight Act 1855 (18 & 19 Vict. c. xxxii))
Bilston Gas Act 1846	9 & 10 Vict. c. xxxix	18 June 1846
An Act to enable the Bilston Gas Light and Coke Company to light with Gas the Town of Bilston, and certain other Townships, Parishes, and Places, in the County of Stafford.
Harrogate Gas Act 1846 (repealed)	9 & 10 Vict. c. xl	18 June 1846
An Act for better supplying with Gas the Townships of Bitten with Harrogate and Pannal, and certain Parts of the Townships of Knaresborough and Scriven with Tentergate, adjacent thereto or intermixed therewith, all in the West Riding of the County of York. (Repealed by Harrogate Gas Company's Act 1863 (26 & 27 Vict. c. xii))
Union Arcade (Glasgow) Act 1846 (repealed)	9 & 10 Vict. c. xli	18 June 1846
An Act for constructing and maintaining an Arcade between Argyle Street and Great Clyde Street in the City of Glasgow, to be called "The Union Arcade," and for altering the Site of an intended Foot Passenger Bridge across the Clyde at Glasgow. (Repealed by Union Arcade Company (Glasgow) Dissolution Act 1852 (15 & 16 Vict. c. xxxiv))
Carshalton Rates Act 1846 (repealed)	9 & 10 Vict. c. xlii	18 June 1846
An Act for the better and more effectual ascertaining, assessing, collecting, and levying the Poor Bate, and all other Rates and Assessments, in the Parish of Carshalton in the County of Surrey, and for the better Management of the Business and Affairs of the said Parish; and for other Purposes relating thereto. (Repealed by Statute Law (Repeals) Act 2008 (c. 12))
Royal Asylum of the St. Ann's Society Act 1846	9 & 10 Vict. c. xliii	18 June 1846
An Act to incorporate the Members of the Institution called "The Royal Asylum of the Saint Anne's Society," and to enable them the better to carry on their charitable Designs.
Electric Telegraph Company's Act 1846 (repealed)	9 & 10 Vict. c. xliv	18 June 1846
An Act for forming and regulating "The Electric Telegraph Company," and to enable the said Company to work certain Letters Patents. (Repealed by Electric Telegraph Company's Act 1853 (16 & 17 Vict. c. cciii))
Caledonian Insurance Company Act 1846 (repealed)	9 & 10 Vict. c. xlv	18 June 1846
An Act for incorporating the "Caledonian Insurance Company;" for enabling the said Company to sue and be sued, to take and to hold Property; for confirming the Rules and Regulations of the said Company; and for other Purposes relating thereto. (Repealed by Caledonian Insurance Company's Act 1923 (13 & 14 Geo. 5. c. xxix))
Road from Deanburn to Cornhill (Berwickshire and Durham) Act 1846 (repealed)	9 & 10 Vict. c. xlvi	18 June 1846
An Act for maintaining the Road from Deanburn in the County of Haddington, through Greenlaw in the County of Berwick, to Cornhill in the County of Durham, with Branches from Carfrae Mill through Lauder, from Orange Lane to Swinton, and from Coldstream to Mount Pleasant, all in the County of Berwick; and for maintaining the Bridge over the River Tweed at Coldstream. (Repealed by Annual Turnpike Acts Continuance Act 1884 (47 & 48 Vict. c. 52))
Berwickshire Roads Act 1846	9 & 10 Vict. c. xlvii	18 June 1846
An Act to enlarge the Term and Powers of an Act made in the Sixth Year of the Reign of His Majesty King George the Fourth, (Note: Whiteburn and Choicelee Road (Berwick) Act 1825 (6 Geo. 4. c. xvi)) for repairing and maintaining the Road from Whiteburn, upon the Turnpike Road from Edinburgh to Greenlaw, passing through Thornydike and Westruther to Choicelee, upon the Turnpike Road from Greenlaw to Dunse, all in the County of Berwick.
Sidmouth Market Act 1846	9 & 10 Vict. c. xlviii	18 June 1846
An Act to alter, amend, and enlarge the Powers and Provisions of an Act passed in the Second and Third Years of the Reign of Her present Majesty, intituled "An Act for maintaining and regulating the Market in the Parish of Sidmouth in the County of Devon." (Note: Sidmouth Market Act 1839 (2 & 3 Vict. c. lxxxi))
Bolton Water Act 1846 (repealed)	9 & 10 Vict. c. xlix	18 June 1846
An Act for more effectually supplying Water to the Inhabitants of the Town of Bolton, and several Townships and Places adjoining or near thereto, in the County of Lancaster. (Repealed by Bolton Improvement Act 1854 (17 & 18 Vict. c. clix))
Dundee New Gas Act 1846	9 & 10 Vict. c. l	18 June 1846
An Act for the better supplying with Gas the Royal Burgh of Dundee, Suburbs thereof, and Places adjacent, in the County of Forfar.
Midland Railway Act 1846	9 & 10 Vict. c. li	18 June 1846
An Act to authorize certain Alterations in the Line of the Syston and Peterborough Branch of the Midland Railway, and the Formation of certain other Branch Railways in connexion therewith.
Maldon, Witham and Braintree Railway Act 1846	9 & 10 Vict. c. lii	18 June 1846
An Act for making a Railway from Maldon, through Witham, to Braintree, all in the County of Essex.
Eastern Union and Hadleigh Junction Railway Act 1846 (repealed)	9 & 10 Vict. c. liii	18 June 1846
An Act for making a Railway from the Eastern Union Railway in the Parish of Bentley to the Town of Hadleigh, all in the County of Suffolk, to be called "The Eastern Union and Hadleigh Junction Railway." (Repealed by Great Eastern Railway Act 1862 (25 & 26 Vict. c. ccxxiii))
London and Brighton Railway (East Grinstead Branch) Act 1846	9 & 10 Vict. c. liv	18 June 1846
An Act for making a Branch Railway from the London and Brighton Railway to or near to the Town of East Grinstead in the County of Sussex.
South Eastern Railway Act 1846	9 & 10 Vict. c. lv	18 June 1846
An Act to enable the South-eastern Railway Company to make and maintain a Railway from the Town of Bye to the Mouth of Rye Harbour.
South Eastern Railway (Ashford Station) Act 1846	9 & 10 Vict. c. lvi	18 June 1846
An Act to enable the South-eastern Railway Company to construct an additional Station at Ashford in the County of Kent; and for other Purposes.
Edinburgh, Leith and Granton Railway Act 1846	9 & 10 Vict. c. lvii	18 June 1846
An Act to amend and enlarge the Powers of the Acts relating to the Edinburgh, Leith, and Granton Railway.
Newcastle and Darlington Junction Railway (Thirsk and Malton Branches) Act 1846	9 & 10 Vict. c. lviii	18 June 1846
An Act for enabling the Newcastle and Darlington Junction Railway Company to make a Railway from or near Thirsk to Malton, with a Branch to Hemsley.
York and North Midland Railway (Whitby and Pickering Extension) Act 1846	9 & 10 Vict. c. lix	18 June 1846
An Act for enabling the York and North Midland Railway Company to extend the Line of the Whitby and Pickering Railway to or near Castleton.
Glasgow, Paisley, Kilmarnock and Ayr Railway Amendment and Branches (No. 1) Act 1846	9 & 10 Vict. c. lx	18 June 1846
An Act to enable the Glasgow, Paisley, Kilmarnock, and Ayr Railway Company to alter their Line near Kilmarnock, and to make Branches to Linwood, Swinlees, and the Kilmarnock and Troon Railway.
Glasgow, Paisley, Kilmarnock and Ayr Railway Amendment and Branches (No. 2) Act 1846 (repealed)	9 & 10 Vict. c. lxi	18 June 1846
An Act to amend the Acts relating to the Glasgow, Paisley, Kilmarnock, and Ayr Railway; and to authorize the Formation of Branches from Busby to Irvine, and from Irvine to the Harbour thereof, with a subsidiary Branch to Perceton Coalworks. (Repealed by Glasgow and South Western Railway Consolidation Act 1855 (18 & 19 Vict. c. xcvii))
Glasgow, Paisley, Kilmarnock and Ayr Railway Amendment and Branches (No. 3) Act 1846 (repealed)	9 & 10 Vict. c. lxii	18 June 1846
An Act to enable the Glasgow, Paisley, Kilmarnock, and Ayr Railway Company to make a Branch from their Railway near Blair to Strathaven; and to amend the Acts relating to such Railway. (Repealed by Glasgow and South Western Railway Consolidation Act 1855 (18 & 19 Vict. c. xcvii))
Brighton, Lewes and Hastings Railway Act 1846	9 & 10 Vict. c. lxiii	18 June 1846
An Act for making Railways from the Brighton, Lewes, and Hastings Railway to Eastbourne, to Hailsham, and to Seaford and Newhaven, and certain Deviations from the Line of the said Railway, all in the County of Sussex.
South Eastern Railway (No. 2) Act 1846	9 & 10 Vict. c. lxiv	18 June 1846
An Act to authorize the South-eastern Railway Company to make a Railway from Tunbridge Wells to join the Rye and Ashford Extension of the Brighton, Lewes, and Hastings Railway near Hastings.
York and North Midland Railway (East Riding Branches) (No. 1) Act 1846	9 & 10 Vict. c. lxv	18 June 1846
An Act for enabling the York and North Midland Railway Company to make certain Branch Railways in the East Riding of the County of York; (Note: York to Beverley branch.) and for other Purposes.
York and North Midland Railway (East Riding Branches) (No. 2) Act 1846	9 & 10 Vict. c. lxvi	18 June 1846
An Act for enabling the York and North Midland Railway Company to make certain Branch Railways in the East Riding of the County of York; (Note: Selby to Market Weighton branch.) and for other Purposes.
Rugby and Stamford Railway Act 1846	9 & 10 Vict. c. lxvii	18 June 1846
An Act to empower the London and Birmingham Railway Company to make a Branch Railway from Rugby to the Syston and Peterborough Railway near Stanford.
London and Brighton (Littlehampton Branch) Railway Act 1846	9 & 10 Vict. c. lxviii	18 June 1846
An Act for making a Branch Railway from the Brighton and Chichester Railway to the Town of Littlehampton in the County of Sussex.
London and Brighton (Steyning Branch) Railway Act 1846	9 & 10 Vict. c. lxix	18 June 1846
An Act for making a Branch Railway from the Brighton and Chichester Railway to the Town of Steyning in the County of Sussex.
Edinburgh and Glasgow Railway Amendment and Branch Act 1846 (repealed)	9 & 10 Vict. c. lxx	18 June 1846
An Act to enable the Edinburgh and Glasgow Railway Company to alter the Line of the Glasgow Junction Railway, and to form a Branch to South Queensferry. (Repealed by Edinburgh and Glasgow Railway Consolidation Act 1852 (15 & 16 Vict. c. cix))
Great Northern Railway Act 1846	9 & 10 Vict. c. lxxi	26 June 1846
An Act for making a Railway from London to York, with Branches therefrom providing for the Counties of Hertford, Bedford, Huntingdon, Northampton, Rutland, Nottingham, and the Three Divisions of the County of Lincoln a Railway Communication with London and York, to be called "The Great Northern Railway."
Edinburgh and Northern Railway (Tay Ferry) Act 1846	9 & 10 Vict. c. lxxii	26 June 1846
An Act to enable the Edinburgh and Northern Railway Company to purchase the Ferry across the River Tag between Ferry-Port-on-Craig and Broughty.
North British Railway (Hawick Branch) Act 1846 (repealed)	9 & 10 Vict. c. lxxiii	26 June 1846
An Act to empower the North British Railway Company to construct certain Branch Railways in connexion with the Hawick Branch of the North British Railway. (Repealed by North British Railway Consolidation Act 1858 (21 & 22 Vict. c. cix))
North British Railway Act 1846	9 & 10 Vict. c. lxxiv	26 June 1846
An Act to authorize the Construction of several Branch Railways and other Works in connexion with the North British Railway.
Scottish Midland Junction Railway Branches Act 1846	9 & 10 Vict. c. lxxv	26 June 1846
An Act to enable the Scottish Midland Junction Railway Company to make certain Branch Railways; and to amend the Act (Note: Scottish Midland Junction Railway Act 1845 (8 & 9 Vict. c. clxx)) relating to such Railway.
Colchester, Stour Valley, Sudbury and Halstead Railway Act 1846	9 & 10 Vict. c. lxxvi	26 June 1846
An Act for making a Railway from the Eastern Counties Railway at Marks Tey near Colchester to the Town of Sudbury in the County of Suffolk, and the Town of Halstead in the County of Essex, with a Branch Railway from the Eastern Union Railway to the Hythe at Colchester.
Malton and Driffield Junction Railway Act 1846	9 & 10 Vict. c. lxxvii	26 June 1846
An Act for making a Railway from the Scarborough Branch of the York and North Midland Railway at Norton near Malton to the Bridlington Branch of the Hull and Selby Railway at Great Driffield, with a Branch therefrom.
Arbroath and Forfar Railway Act 1846	9 & 10 Vict. c. lxxviii	26 June 1846
An Act to enable the Arbroath and Forfar Railway Company to raise an additional Sum of Money; and to amend the Acts relating to the said Company.
Edinburgh and Northern Railway (Pettycur Harbour Branch and Deviation) Act 1846	9 & 10 Vict. c. lxxix	26 June 1846
An Act to enable the Edinburgh and Northern Railway Company to alter their Line of Railway near to Dysart, to make a Branch Railway from Kinghorn to the Harbour of Pettycur, and for other Purposes relating to the said Company.
Manchester and Birmingham Railway Act 1846	9 & 10 Vict. c. lxxx	26 June 1846
An Act to empower the Manchester and Birmingham Railway Company to make a Branch Railway to Bollington.
Caledonian and Dumbartonshire Junction Railway Act 1846	9 & 10 Vict. c. lxxxi	26 June 1846
An Act for making a Railway from Glasgow to Dumbarton and Lochlomond, and with Branches to Helensburgh and other Places, to be called "The Caledonian and Dumbartonshire Junction Railway."
Oxford and Bletchley Junction Railway Act 1846	9 & 10 Vict. c. lxxxii	26 June 1846
An Act for making a Railway from Oxford to the London and Birmingham Railway at Bletchley in the County of Buckingham.
Direct London and Portsmouth Railway Act 1846	9 & 10 Vict. c. lxxxiii	26 June 1846
An Act for making a Railway from the Croydon and Epsom Railway at Epsom to the Town of Portsmouth, to be called "The Direct London and Portsmouth Railway."
North Staffordshire Railway (Harecastle and Sandbach Line) Act 1846 (repealed)	9 & 10 Vict. c. lxxxiv	26 June 1846
An Act for making a Railway from Harecastle to join the Manchester and Birmingham Railway at or near the Sandbach Station thereon. (Repealed by North Staffordshire Railway Act 1847 (10 & 11 Vict. c. cviii))
North Staffordshire Railway (Pottery Line) Act 1846	9 & 10 Vict. c. lxxxv	26 June 1846
An Act for making a Railway from the Manchester and Birmingham Railway at Macclesfield to the Trent Valley Railway at Colwich, with Branches.
North Staffordshire Railway (Churnet Valley) Act 1846 (repealed)	9 & 10 Vict. c. lxxxvi	26 June 1846
An Act for making a Railway from the Manchester and Birmingham Railway at Macclesfield to join the Birmingham and Derby Line of the Midland Railways, with a Branch to Stoke-upon-Trent. (Repealed by North Staffordshire Railway Act 1847 (10 & 11 Vict. c. cviii))
Belfast and County Down Railway Act 1846 (repealed)	9 & 10 Vict. c. lxxxvii	26 June 1846
An Act for making a Railway from Belfast to Downpatrick, with Branches to the Towns of Holywood, Newtownards, Bangor, and Donaghadee, all in the County of Down. (Repealed by Belfast and County Down Railway Act 1855 (18 & 19 Vict. c. xviii))
East Lincolnshire Railway Act 1846	9 & 10 Vict. c. lxxxviii	26 June 1846
An Act for making a Railway from Great Grimsby by Louth and Alford to Boston, all in the County of Lincoln, to be called "The East Lincolnshire Railway."
York and North Midland Railway (Leeds Extension) Act 1846	9 & 10 Vict. c. lxxxix	26 June 1846
An Act for enabling the York and North Midland Railway Company to make a more direct Line of Railway between York and Leeds.
Liverpool, Manchester and Newcastle-upon-Tyne Junction Railway Act 1846	9 & 10 Vict. c. xc	26 June 1846
An Act for making a Railway, to be called "The Liverpool, Manchester, and Newcastle-upon-Tyne Junction Railway," with a Branch to the Town of Hawes.
Birkenhead, Lancashire and Cheshire Junction Railway Act 1846 (repealed)	9 & 10 Vict. c. xci	26 June 1846
An Act for making a Railway from the Chester and Birkenhead Railway to the Manchester and Birmingham Railway, with Branches therefrom, to be called "The Birkenhead, Lancashire, and Cheshire Junction Railway." (Repealed by Birkenhead, Lancashire and Cheshire Junction Railway Act 1852 (15 & 16 Vict. c. clxvii))
North Western Railway Act 1846	9 & 10 Vict. c. xcii	26 June 1846
An Act for making a Railway from the Leeds and Bradford Extension Railway to the Lancaster and Carlisle Railway, with a diverging Line therefrom to Lancaster, to be called "The North-western Railway."
Boston, Stamford and Birmingham Railway (Stamford and Wisbech Line) Act 1846	9 & 10 Vict. c. xciii	26 June 1846
An Act for making a Railway from the Line of the Syston and Peterborough Railway in the Parish of Helpstone, near to the Town of Stamford, to the Line of the Wisbech Branch of the Lynn and Ely Railway at or near to the Town of Wisbech, to be called "The Boston, Stamford, and Birmingham Railway."
Port Ellen Harbour Act 1846	9 & 10 Vict. c. xciv	26 June 1846
An Act for improving and maintaining the Harbour of Port Ellen in the County of Argyll.
Great North of England and Boroughbridge Branch Railway Act 1846	9 & 10 Vict. c. xcv	26 June 1846
An Act for enabling the Newcastle and Darlington Junction Railway Company to make a Railway from the Line of the Great North of England Railway to or near to Boroughbridge.
Great North of England and Bedale Branch Railway Act 1846	9 & 10 Vict. c. xcvi	26 June 1846
An Act for enabling the Newcastle and Darlington Junction Railway Company to make a Railway from the Line of the Great North of England Railway to Bedale.
Eastern Union (Ardleigh and Colchester) Railway Act 1846 (repealed)	9 & 10 Vict. c. xcvii	26 June 1846
An Act to empower the Eastern Union Railway Company to complete the Eastern Union Railway from the Junction thereof with the Line of the Eastern Counties Railway at Ardleigh to Colchester. (Repealed by Great Eastern Railway Act 1862 (25 & 26 Vict. c. ccxxiii))
Great Grimsby and Sheffield Junction Railway (Branch to Caistor) Act 1846 (repealed)	9 & 10 Vict. c. xcviii	26 June 1846
An Act for making certain new Lines and Deviations in the Line of the Great Grimsby and Sheffield Junction Railway, and for constructing a Branch therefrom to the Town of Caistor, all in the Parts of Lindsey in the County of Lincoln. (Repealed by Manchester, Sheffield and Lincolnshire Railway Act 1849 (12 & 13 Vict. c. lxxxi))
Great Grimsby and Sheffield Junction Railway (Lincoln Extension) Act 1846 (repealed)	9 & 10 Vict. c. xcix	26 June 1846
An Act for enabling the Great Grimsby and Sheffield Junction Railway Company to make an Extension from the Market Rasen Branch from the Great Grimsby and Sheffield Junction Railway to communicate with the City of Lincoln, and also a Branch to the Town of Barton-upon-Humber, and other Works connected therewith. (Repealed by Manchester, Sheffield and Lincolnshire Railway Act 1849 (12 & 13 Vict. c. lxxxi))
Great Grimsby and Sheffield Junction Railway (Newark Extension) Act 1846 (repealed)	9 & 10 Vict. c. c	26 June 1846
An Act to authorize the Great Grimsby and Sheffield Junction Railway Company to make an Extension from their Line of Railway in the Parish of Sole in the County of Nottingham, to the Town of Newark-upon-Trent in the same County. (Repealed by Manchester, Sheffield and Lincolnshire Railway Act 1849 (12 & 13 Vict. c. lxxxi))
Great Grimsby and Sheffield Junction Railway (Humber Ferry) Act 1846 (repealed)	9 & 10 Vict. c. ci	26 June 1846
An Act for establishing a Steam Communication across the River Number in connexion with "The Great Grimsby and Sheffield Junction Railway." (Repealed by Manchester, Sheffield and Lincolnshire Railway Act 1849 (12 & 13 Vict. c. lxxxi))
Midland Railway (Erewash Valley Extension) Act 1846	9 & 10 Vict. c. cii	26 June 1846
An Act to empower the Midland Railway Company to make a Railway from Pye Bridge to the Clay Cross Station of the Midland Railway, and a Branch in the Parish of Crich.
Great North of Scotland Railway Act 1846 (repealed)	9 & 10 Vict. c. ciii	26 June 1846
An Act for making a Railway from Aberdeen to Inverness, with Branches to Banff, Portsoy, Garmouth, and Burghead, to be called "The Great North of Scotland Railway." (Repealed by Great North of Scotland Railway Consolidation Act 1859 (22 & 23 Vict. c. viii))
Ballochney Railway Act 1846	9 & 10 Vict. c. civ	26 June 1846
An Act to enable the Ballochney Railway Company to improve the Gauge of their Rails.
Bristol and South Wales Junction Railway Act 1846 (repealed)	9 & 10 Vict. c. cv	26 June 1846
An Act for making a Railway Communication between the City of Bristol and the proposed South Wales Railway in the County of Monmouth, with a Branch Railway therefrom. (Repealed by Statute Law (Repeals) Act 2013 (c. 2))
Navigation between Stowmarket and Ipswich Act 1846	9 & 10 Vict. c. cvi	26 June 1846
An Act for amending an Act passed in the Thirtieth Year of the Reign of His late Majesty King George the Third, (Note: Ipswich and Stowmarket Navigation Act 1790 (30 Geo. 3. c. 57)) for making and maintaining a navigable Communication between Stowmarket and Ipswich in the County of Suffolk, so as to enable the Trustees of such Act to lease the said Navigation; and for other Purposes connected therewith.
Slamannan and Borrowstounness Railway Act 1846	9 & 10 Vict. c. cvii	26 June 1846
An Act to enable the Slamannan Railway Company to make a Railway to Borrowstouness, with Branches to the Edinburgh and Glasgow Railway.
Portsmouth Harbour Pier Act 1846 (repealed)	9 & 10 Vict. c. cviii	26 June 1846
An Act for making a Pier from the Common Hard at the Eastern or Portsmouth Side of the Harbour of Portsmouth in the Parish of Portsea in the County of Southampton. (Repealed by Portsea Harbour Company Act 1984 (c. xviii))
Liverpool Docks Act 1846 (repealed)	9 & 10 Vict. c. cix	26 June 1846
An Act for enabling the Trustees of the Liverpool Docks to construct additional Wet Docks and other Works, and to raise a further Sum of Money; and for extending and amending the Acts relating to the Docks and Harbour of Liverpool. (Repealed by Mersey Dock Acts Consolidation Act 1858 (21 & 22 Vict. c. xcii))
Northumberland Dock Company's Act 1846	9 & 10 Vict. c. cx	26 June 1846
An Act for constructing Docks and other Works at Coble Dean in the County of Northumberland, and in the Borough and County of Newcastle-upon-Tyne, to be called "The Northumberland Docks."
Lincoln Waterworks Act 1846	9 & 10 Vict. c. cxi	26 June 1846
An Act for better supplying with Water the Inhabitants of the City of Lincoln, and certain Parishes and Places adjacent thereto in the County of Lincoln.
Warrington Waterworks Act 1846 (repealed)	9 & 10 Vict. c. cxii	26 June 1846
An Act for the better supplying with Water the Town and Borough of Warrington, or Parts thereof, in the Counties of Lancaster and Chester, and the Townships o£ Latchford and Appleton in the last-mentioned County. (Repealed by Warrington Waterworks Act 1855 (18 & 19 Vict. c. xciii))
Harrogate Waterworks Act 1846 (repealed)	9 & 10 Vict. c. cxiii	26 June 1846
An Act for supplying with Water the Hamlets or Places of High and Low Harrogate in the several Townships of Knaresborough, Pannal, Bilton-with-Harrogate, and Scriven-with-Tentergate, in the Parishes of Knaresborough and Pannal in the West Riding of the County of York. (Repealed by Harrogate Stray Act 1985 (c. xxii))
Stafford Gas Act 1846 (repealed)	9 & 10 Vict. c. cxiv	26 June 1846
An Act for better supplying with Gas the Town and Borough of Stafford, and the several Parishes and Townships of Saint Mary and Saint Chad in Stafford, Castle Church, Hopton and Coton, and Tillington, all in the County of Stafford. (Repealed by Stafford Gas Act 1854 (17 & 18 Vict. c. xxii))
Hartlepool Gas and Waterworks Act 1846 (repealed)	9 & 10 Vict. c. cxv	26 June 1846
An Act for lighting with Gas and supplying with Water the Town of Hartlepool and the Neighbourhood thereof in the County of Durham. (Repealed by Hartlepool Gas and Waterworks Act 1849 (12 & 13 Vict. c. xxv))
Kendal Union Gas and Water Act 1846 (repealed)	9 & 10 Vict. c. cxvi	26 June 1846
An Act for better supplying with Gas and Water the Town and Parish of Kendal in the County of Westmoreland. (Repealed by Kendal Corporation Gas and Water Act 1894 (57 & 58 Vict. c. lxxviii))
Great Grimsby Gas Company Act 1846 (repealed)	9 & 10 Vict. c. cxvii	26 June 1846
An Act for lighting with Gas the Parish and Borough of Great Grimsby in the County of Lincoln. (Repealed by Humberside Act 1982 (c. iii))
Hamilton New Gas Light Company Act 1846	9 & 10 Vict. c. cxviii	26 June 1846
An Act for supplying and lighting the Town of Hamilton and Places adjacent thereto with Gas.
Burnley Improvement and Water Act 1846 (repealed)	9 & 10 Vict. c. cxix	26 June 1846
An Act for better paving, lighting, cleansing, regulating, and improving the Town of Burnley in the County Palatine of Lancaster, and for better supplying the Inhabitants thereof with Water. (Repealed by Burnley Improvement Act 1854 (17 & 18 Vict. c. lxvii))
Liverpool Improvement Act 1846 (repealed)	9 & 10 Vict. c. cxx	26 June 1846
An Act to alter, amend, and enlarge the Powers and Provisions of an Act passed in the First Year of the Reign of Her present Majesty, intituled "An Act to enable the Mayor, Aldermen, and Burgesses of the Borough of Liverpool to open and widen certain Streets and Places, and otherwise to improve the same; and to enable the said Mayor, Aldermen, and Burgesses to appropriate certain Lands, Tenements, and Hereditaments for public Purposes, and also to erect public Buildings." (Note: Liverpool Improvement Act 1837 (7 Will. 4 & 1 Vict. c. cxv)) (Repealed by Liverpool Corporation Act 1921 (11 & 12 Geo. 5. c. lxxiv))
Newcastle-upon-Tyne Improvement Act 1846 (repealed)	9 & 10 Vict. c. cxxi	26 June 1846
An Act for lighting with Gas the Borough of Newcastle-upon-Tyne, and for varying and extending the Powers of the several Acts for regulating and improving the said Borough. (Repealed by Tyne and Wear Act 1980 (c. xliii))
Sittingbourne Improvement Act 1846 (repealed)	9 & 10 Vict. c. cxxii	26 June 1846
An Act for paving the Footways in the Town of Sittingbourne in the Parish of Sittingbourne in the County of Kent, and for lighting the Streets, and for the Removal and Prevention of Nuisances and Annoyances within the said Parish. (Repealed by Local Government Board's Provisional Orders Confirmation Act 1874 (No. 3) (37 & 38 Vict. c. lxxxix))
York Improvement Act 1846 (repealed)	9 & 10 Vict. c. cxxiii	26 June 1846
An Act for widening, altering, and improving certain Streets within the City of York; and for other Purposes. (Repealed by York Corporation Act 1969 (c. xxxviii))
Bromsgrove Improvement and Small Tenements Act 1846 (repealed)	9 & 10 Vict. c. cxxiv	26 June 1846
An Act for paving, cleansing, draining, and improving the Town of Bromsgrove, for opening a new Street therein and in the Parish of Stoke Prior, both in the County of Worcester, and for the better assessing and collecting the Poor, Church, and Highway Rates within the Parish of Bromsgrove. (Repealed by Statute Law (Repeals) Act 1998 (c. 43))
Leith Improvement Act 1846	9 & 10 Vict. c. cxxv	26 June 1846
An Act for regulating the Repair and Maintenance of the Roads and Streets within the Town of Leith, and the Assessments payable in respect thereof.
Salford Hundred Court Act 1846 (repealed)	9 & 10 Vict. c. cxxvi	26 June 1846
An Act for more effectually regulating the Salford Hundred Court, for extending the Jurisdiction and Powers of the said Court, and for establishing and constituting it as a Court of Record. (Repealed by Salford Hundred Court of Record Act 1868 (31 & 32 Vict. c. cxxx))
Liverpool Sanitation Act 1846 or the Liverpool Sanatory Act 1846 (repealed)	9 & 10 Vict. c. cxxvii	26 June 1846
An Act for the Improvement of the Sewerage and Drainage of the Borough of Liverpool, and for making further Provisions for the sanatory Regulation of the said Borough. (Repealed by Liverpool Corporation Act 1921 (11 & 12 Geo. 5. c. lxxiv))
Rivers Rye and Derwent Drainage Act 1846	9 & 10 Vict. c. cxxviii	26 June 1846
An Act for improving the Drainage of the Vallies of the Bye and Derwent in the North and East Ridings of the County of York.
Exeter and Exmouth Railway Act 1846	9 & 10 Vict. c. cxxix	3 July 1846
An Act for making a Railway from Exeter to Exmouth, to be called "The Exeter and Exmouth Railway."
General Terminus and Glasgow Harbour Railway Act 1846	9 & 10 Vict. c. cxxx	3 July 1846
An Act for making a Railway from the Polloc and Govan Railway to the River Clyde and Harbour of Glasgow, with Branches, to be called "The General Terminus and Glasgow Harbour Railway."
London and South Western Railway Amendment Act 1846	9 & 10 Vict. c. cxxxi	3 July 1846
An Act for amending the Acts relating to the London and South-western Railway Company; and to authorize the said Company to enter into Contracts and to complete Arrangements with certain other Railway Companies.
Norfolk Railway Act 1846	9 & 10 Vict. c. cxxxii	3 July 1846
An Act for enabling the Norfolk Railway Company to purchase or lease the Lowestoft Railway, Harbour, and Navigation.
Dundee and Arbroath Railway Act 1846	9 & 10 Vict. c. cxxxiii	3 July 1846
An Act to enable the Dundee and Arbroath Railway Company to make a Railway from their Line at Broughty to Broughty Ferry Castle, and another Railway from their Line at Geordies Burn to the Arbroath and Forfar Railway at Almeriecloss.
Alford Valley Railway Act 1846	9 & 10 Vict. c. cxxxiv	3 July 1846
An Act for making a Railway from Kintore to Alford, to be called "The Alford Valley Railway."
Great North of Scotland (Eastern Extension) Railway Act 1846	9 & 10 Vict. c. cxxxv	3 July 1846
An Act for making a Railway from Dyce to Fraserburgh, with a Branch to Peterhead, to be called "The Great North of Scotland {Eastern Extension) Railway."
Edinburgh and Northern Railway (Newport Railway Extension) Act 1846	9 & 10 Vict. c. cxxxvi	3 July 1846
An Act to enable the Edinburgh and Northern Railway Company to extend their Line of Railway from Cupar to Newport.
Scottish Grand Junction Railway Act 1846	9 & 10 Vict. c. cxxxvii	3 July 1846
An Act for making a Railway from the Town of Oban to Crianlarich in the County of Perth, with a Branch to Lochlomond, to be called "The Scottish Grand Junction Railway."
Edinburgh and Northern Railway (Dunfermline Branch) Act 1846	9 & 10 Vict. c. cxxxviii	3 July 1846
An Act to enable the Edinburgh and Northern Railway Company to make a Railway from their Line at Thornton to Dunfermline.
Edinburgh and Northern Railway (Strathearn Deviation) Act 1846	9 & 10 Vict. c. cxxxix	3 July 1846
An Act to enable the Edinburgh and Northern Railway Company to make a Railway from Newburgh to the Scottish Central Railway at Hilton.
Great Leinster and Munster Railway Act 1846	9 & 10 Vict. c. cxl	3 July 1846
An Act to enable the Great Leinster and Munster Railway Company to extend their Railway to Clonmel.
Glasgow, Strathaven and Lesmahagow Direct Railway Act 1846	9 & 10 Vict. c. cxli	3 July 1846
An Act for making a Railway from and out of the Glasgow, Barrhead, and Neilston Direct Railway near to Pollohshaws to the Town of Strathaven.
Glasgow, Barrhead and Neilston Direct Railway (Branches to Thornliebank and Househill) Act 1846	9 & 10 Vict. c. cxlii	3 July 1846
An Act to enable the Glasgow, Barrhead, and Neilston Direct Railway Company to make Branch Railways to Thornliebank and Househill; and to amend the Act (Note: Glasgow, Barrhead and Neilston Direct Railway Act 1845 (8 & 9 Vict. c. cxcii)) relating to such Railway.
Glasgow, Paisley and Greenock Railway Act 1846	9 & 10 Vict. c. cxliii	3 July 1846
An Act to enable the Glasgow, Paisley, and Greenoch Railway Company to make a Branch Railway to the River and Frith of Clyde at or near Greenoch, and a Pier or Wharf in connexion therewith.
Thames Haven Dock and Railway Act 1846 (repealed)	9 & 10 Vict. c. cxliv	3 July 1846
An Act for extending the Time for taking Lands, and for completing the Undertaking called "The Thames Haven Dock and Railway," authorized to be made by Two Acts passed in the Seventh Year of the Reign of His late Majesty (Note: Thames Haven, Dock and Railway Act 1836 (6 & 7 Will. 4. c. cviii)) and the Sixth Year of the Reign of Her present Majesty. (Note: Thames Haven Dock and Railway Act 1842 (5 & 6 Vict. c. lxxxix)) (Repealed by Thames Haven Dock Company's Act 1856 (19 & 20 Vict. c. cxix))
Bridgwater and Taunton Canal and Stolford Railway and Harbour Act 1846	9 & 10 Vict. c. cxlv	3 July 1846
An Act to enable the Bridgewater and Taunton Canal Company to make a Railway from Bridgewater to the Bristol Channel at or near Stolford in the County of Somerset, with Branches therefrom, and to make a Harbour at or near Stolford.
Herculaneum Dock Act 1846	9 & 10 Vict. c. cxlvi	3 July 1846
An Act for constructing Docks, Walls, Warehouses, and other Works at Toxteth Park in the County of Lancaster, to be called "The Herculaneum Docks."
Forth and Clyde and Monkland Navigation Junction Act 1846	9 & 10 Vict. c. cxlvii	3 July 1846
An Act to authorize the Sale of the Monkland Navigation to the Company of Proprietors of the Forth and Clyde Navigation.
Cork, Blackrock and Passage Railway Act 1846	9 & 10 Vict. c. cxlviii	16 July 1846
An Act for making a Railway from the Borough of Cork through Blackrock to the Town of Passage West.
Leeds and Hartlepool Railway Act 1846	9 & 10 Vict. c. cxlix	16 July 1846
An Act to enable the Leeds and Thirsk Railway Company to make a Railway from Northallerton to the Stockton and Hartlepool Railway.
Scottish Central Railway (Alloa Branch) Act 1846 (repealed)	9 & 10 Vict. c. cl	16 July 1846
An Act to enable the Scottish Central Railway Company to make a Branch Railway by Alloa Ferry to Tillicoultry. (Repealed by Scottish Central Railway Consolidation Act 1859 (22 & 23 Vict. c. lxxxiii))
Slamannan Railway, Bathgate and Jawcraig Branches Act 1846	9 & 10 Vict. c. cli	16 July 1846
An Act to enable the Slamannan Railway Company to make Branch Railways to Bathgate and Jawcraig.
London and Birmingham Railway Act 1846	9 & 10 Vict. c. clii	16 July 1846
An Act to empower the London and Birmingham Railway Company to enlarge their Stations in London; and for other Purposes.
Leeds and Thirsk (St. Helens Branch Deviation) Railway Act 1846	9 & 10 Vict. c. cliii	16 July 1846
An Act for enabling the Leeds and Thirsk Railway Company to make certain Deviations in the Line of the Saint Helens Branch of the said Railway.
Leeds and Thirsk Railway (Knaresborough Extension) Act 1846	9 & 10 Vict. c. cliv	16 July 1846
An Act to enable the Leeds and Thirsk Railway Company to alter and extend the Line of Part of their Railway; and for other Purposes.
Ambergate, Nottingham and Boston and Eastern Junction Railway Act 1846	9 & 10 Vict. c. clv	16 July 1846
An Act for making a Railway from or near the Ambergate Station of the Midland Railway, through Nottingham, to Spalding and Boston, with Branches therefrom, and for enabling the Company to purchase the Nottingham and Grantham Canals.
Midland Railway (Erewash Valley Branches) Act 1846	9 & 10 Vict. c. clvi	16 July 1846
An Act to empower the Midland Railway Company to make several Branches from the Erewash Valley Railway.
Midland Railway (Clay Cross and Newark Railway) Act 1846	9 & 10 Vict. c. clvii	16 July 1846
An Act to empower the Midland Railway Company to make a Railway from the Midland Railway at Clay Cross to join the Nottingham and Lincoln Railway, with Branches.
Deeside Railway (Aberdeen to Aboyne) Act 1846 or the Deeside Railway Act 1846 (repealed)	9 & 10 Vict. c. clviii	16 July 1846
An Act for making a Railway from Ferryhill near Aberdeen to Aboyne, to be called "The Deeside Railway." (Repealed by Deeside Railway Act 1852 (15 & 16 Vict. c. lxi))
Glasgow, Kilmarnock and Ardrossan Railway Act 1846	9 & 10 Vict. c. clix	16 July 1846
An Act for making a Railway from the Glasgow, Barrhead, and Neilston Direct Railway to the Town of Kilmarnock, with certain Branches therefrom, to be called "The Glasgow, Kilmarnock, and Ardrossan Railway," and to purchase the Ardrossan Railway and Harbour.
Wilsontown, Morningside and Coltness Railway (Caledonian Railway Junction) Act 1846 (repealed)	9 & 10 Vict. c. clx	16 July 1846
An Act to enable the Wilsontown, Morningside, and Coltness Railway Company to make a Branch to the Caledonian Railway. (Repealed by Edinburgh and Glasgow Railway Consolidation Act 1852 (15 & 16 Vict. c. cix))
Wilsontown, Morningside and Coltness Railway (Improvement and Shotts Branch) Act 1846 (repealed)	9 & 10 Vict. c. clxi	16 July 1846
An Act to enable the Wilsontown, Morningside, and Coltness Railway Company to improve their Line, and to make Branch Railways to Shotts and Climpy. (Repealed by Edinburgh and Glasgow Railway Consolidation Act 1852 (15 & 16 Vict. c. cix))
Wilsontown, Morningside and Coltness Railway (Bathgate Branch) Act 1846 (repealed)	9 & 10 Vict. c. clxii	16 July 1846
An Act to enable the Wilsontown, Morningside, and Coltness Railway Company to make a Branch Railway to the Town of Bathgate. (Repealed by Edinburgh and Glasgow Railway Consolidation Act 1852 (15 & 16 Vict. c. cix))
Midland Railway (Nottingham and Mansfield) Act 1846	9 & 10 Vict. c. clxiii	16 July 1846
An Act to empower the Midland Railway Company to make a Railway from Nottingham to Mansfield.
East and West Yorkshire Junction Railway Act 1846	9 & 10 Vict. c. clxiv	16 July 1846
An Act for making a Railway from Knaresborough to or near to the City of York, to be called "The East and West Yorkshire Junction Railway."
Stirlingshire Midland Junction Railway Act 1846 (repealed)	9 & 10 Vict. c. clxv	16 July 1846
An Act for making a Railway from the Edinburgh and Glasgow Railway to the Scottish Central Railway, to be called "The Stirlingshire Midland Junction Railway." (Repealed by Edinburgh and Glasgow Railway Consolidation Act 1852 (15 & 16 Vict. c. cix))
Great Western and Uxbridge Railway Act 1846	9 & 10 Vict. c. clxvi	16 July 1846
An Act for making a Railway from the Great Western Railway at West Drayton to Uxbridge in Middlesex.
Wexford, Carlow and Dublin Junction Railway Act 1846	9 & 10 Vict. c. clxvii	16 July 1846
An Act for making a Railway from Wexford to Carlow.
Great Leinster and Munster Railway (No. 2) Act 1846	9 & 10 Vict. c. clxviii	16 July 1846
An Act for extending and altering some of the Provisions of the Acts relating to the Great Leinster and Munster Railway.
Norfolk Railway Extensions (Dereham, Wells and Blakeney Branch) Act 1846 (repealed)	9 & 10 Vict. c. clxix	16 July 1846
An Act to empower the Norfolk Railway Company to make a Railway Communication between the Dereham Branch of the Norfolk Railway and the Towns of Wells and Blakeney in the County of Norfolk. (Repealed by Great Eastern Railway Act 1862 (25 & 26 Vict. c. ccxxiii))
Royston and Hitchin Railway Act 1846	9 & 10 Vict. c. clxx	16 July 1846
An Act for making a Railway from Royston to Hitchin.
Reading, Guildford and Reigate Railway Act 1846	9 & 10 Vict. c. clxxi	16 July 1846
An Act for making a Railway from Reading to Guildford and Reigate.
Newmarket and Chesterford Railway Act 1846 (repealed)	9 & 10 Vict. c. clxxii	16 July 1846
An Act for making a Railway from Chesterford to Newmarket, with a Branch to Cambridge. (Repealed by Great Eastern Railway Act 1862 (25 & 26 Vict. c. ccxxiii))
London and South Western Railway (Farnham and Alton Branch) Act 1846	9 & 10 Vict. c. clxxiii	16 July 1846
An Act to enable the London and South-western Railway Company to make a Branch Railway to Farnham in the County of Surrey and Alton in the County of Southampton.
London and South Western Railway (Chertsey and Egham Branch) Act 1846	9 & 10 Vict. c. clxxiv	16 July 1846
An Act to enable the London and South-western Railway Company to make a Branch Railway to Chertsey and Egham in the County of Surrey.
London and South Western Railway (Hampton Court Branch) Act 1846	9 & 10 Vict. c. clxxv	16 July 1846
An Act to enable the London and South-western Railway Company to make a Branch Railway to Hampton Court Bridge in the County of Surrey.
Dunblane, Doune and Callander Railway Act 1846	9 & 10 Vict. c. clxxvi	16 July 1846
An Act for making a Railway from the Scottish Central Railway at Dunblane by Doune to Callander, to be called "The Dunblane, Doune, and Callander Railway."
Wharfdale Railway Act 1846	9 & 10 Vict. c. clxxvii	16 July 1846
An Act for making a Railway from Skipton to York, to be called "The Wharfdale Railway."
Morayshire Railway Act 1846	9 & 10 Vict. c. clxxviii	16 July 1846
An Act for making a Railway from Stotfield and Lossiemouth Harbour to Elgin, Rothes, and Craigellachie, to be called "The Morayshire Railway."
Monkland and Kirkintilloch Railway (Chapel Hall Branch) Act 1846	9 & 10 Vict. c. clxxix	16 July 1846
An Act to enable the Monkland and Kirkintilloch Railway Company to make Branch Railways to Chapel Hall, and the Glasgow, Garnkirk, and Coatbridge Railway.
Scottish Central Railway (Denny Branch) Act 1846 (repealed)	9 & 10 Vict. c. clxxx	16 July 1846
An Act to enable the Scottish Central Railway Company to make a Branch Railway to Denny in the County of Stirling. (Repealed by Scottish Central Railway Consolidation Act 1859 (22 & 23 Vict. c. lxxxiii))
Bristol and Exeter Railway Act 1846	9 & 10 Vict. c. clxxxi	16 July 1846
An Act for making a Railway from the Yeovil Branch of the Bristol and Exeter Railway to or towards the Town of Crewkerne in the County of Somerset; and for amending the Acts relating to the Bristol and Exeter Railway.
London and Birmingham Railway (Aylesbury Railway) Act 1846	9 & 10 Vict. c. clxxxii	16 July 1846
An Act for vesting the Aylesbury Railway in the London and Birmingham Railway Company.
St. Helens Canal and Railway Act 1846	9 & 10 Vict. c. clxxxiii	16 July 1846
An Act to enable the Saint Helens Canal and Railway Company to make a Railway from the Township of Eccleston to the Township of Garston, with Branches therefrom, and Docks at Garston aforesaid, all in the County of Lancaster.
Morecambe Harbour and Railway Act 1846	9 & 10 Vict. c. clxxxiv	16 July 1846
An Act for making a Harbour and Docks at Heysham on Morecambe Bay in the County of Lancaster, and a Railway in connexion therewith.
Wakefield, Pontefract and Goole Railway (New Branches) Act 1846	9 & 10 Vict. c. clxxxv	16 July 1846
An Act to empower the Wakefield, Pontefract, and Goole Railway Company to make Three several Branch Railways.
Ardrossan Burgh Act 1846	9 & 10 Vict. c. clxxxvi	16 July 1846
An Act for erecting the Town or Village of Ardrossan and Places adjacent in the County of Ayr into a Burgh of Barony; for paving, lighting, and cleansing the same; for establishing a police therein; and for other Purposes relating thereto.
Sheffield, Ashton-under-Lyne and Manchester Railway (Dukinfield and Glossop Branches and Sheffield Station Enlargement) Act 1846 (repealed)	9 & 10 Vict. c. clxxxvii	16 July 1846
An Act for enabling the Sheffield, Ashton under Lyne, and Manchester Railway Company to provide additional Station Room at Sheffield, and also to make a Branch Railway to Dukinfield, and to purchase and maintain a Branch already made from their Main Line to Glossop; and for other Purposes. (Repealed by Manchester, Sheffield and Lincolnshire Railway Act 1894 (57 & 58 Vict. c. lxxxi))
Glasgow, Paisley and Greenock Railway (No. 2) Act 1846	9 & 10 Vict. c. clxxxviii	16 July 1846
An Act to enable the Glasgow, Paisley, and Greenock Railway Company to make a Branch Railway to the Polloc and Govan Railway; and to amend the Acts relating to the said Railway.
Scottish Central Railway (Perth Termini and Stations) Act 1846 (repealed)	9 & 10 Vict. c. clxxxix	16 July 1846
An Act to enable the Scottish Central Railway Company to make certain Terminal Branches and other Works at the City of Perth. (Repealed by Scottish Central Railway Consolidation Act 1859 (22 & 23 Vict. c. lxxxiii))
East of Fife Railway Act 1846 (repealed)	9 & 10 Vict. c. cxc	16 July 1846
An Act for making a Railway from the Edinburgh and Northern Railway at Markinch to Anstruther Easter, with a Branch to the Kirkland Works, to be called "The East of Fife Railway." (Repealed by East of Fife Railway Dissolution Act 1850 (13 & 14 Vict. c. xcvii))
Scottish Central Railway (Crieff Branch) Act 1846 (repealed)	9 & 10 Vict. c. cxci	16 July 1846
An Act to enable the Scottish Central Railway Company to make a Branch Railway to Crieff in the County of Perth. (Repealed by Scottish Central Railway Consolidation Act 1859 (22 & 23 Vict. c. lxxxiii))
Manchester, Buxton, Matlock and Midlands Junction Railway Act 1846	9 & 10 Vict. c. cxcii	16 July 1846
An Act for making a Railway from the Manchester and Birmingham Railway at Cheadle in the County of Chester to or near to the Ambergate Station of the Midlands Railway in the County of Derby, to be called "The Manchester, Buxton, Matlock, and Midlands Junction Railway."
Grand Junction Railway Act 1846	9 & 10 Vict. c. cxciii	16 July 1846
An Act for enabling the Grand Junction Railway Company to make a Branch Line of Railway from Huyton to Warrington; and for amending the former Acts relating to the said Company.
Mallow and Fermoy Railway Act 1846	9 & 10 Vict. c. cxciv	16 July 1846
An Act for making a Railway from the Town of Mallow to the Town of Fermoy.
Limerick, Ennis and Killaloe Junction Railway Act 1846	9 & 10 Vict. c. cxcv	16 July 1846
An Act for making a Railway from the City or Borough of Limerick to the Borough of Ennis, with Branches to the Towns of Clare and Killaloe, and to join the Great Southern and Western Railway.
Great Southern and Western Railway (Ireland), Cork Extension Act 1846	9 & 10 Vict. c. cxcvi	16 July 1846
An Act to enable the Great Southern and Western Railway Company to extend their Railway from their present Terminus in the City of Cork to the River Lee in the same City.
Mountmellick Junction Railway Act 1846	9 & 10 Vict. c. cxcvii	16 July 1846
An Act for making a Railway from the Great Southern and Western Railway at the Townland of Came or Curraghane to the Town of Mountmellick.
Clonmel and Thurles Railway Act 1846	9 & 10 Vict. c. cxcviii	16 July 1846
An Act for completing a Railway Communication between the Town of Clonmel and the Great Southern and Western Railway at or near the Town of Thurles.
Dublin, Dundrum and Rathfarnham Railway Act 1846 (repealed)	9 & 10 Vict. c. cxcix	16 July 1846
An Act for making a Railway from Dublin to Dundrum and Rathfarnham, to be called "The Dublin, Dundrum, and Rathfarnham Railway." (Repealed by Dublin and Wicklow Railway Amendment Act 1857 (c.xxix))
Killarney Junction Railway Act 1846	9 & 10 Vict. c. cc	16 July 1846
An Act for making a Railway from the Town of Mallow to the Town of Killarney, to be called "The Killarney Junction Railway."
Glasgow Southern Terminal Railway Act 1846	9 & 10 Vict. c. cci	16 July 1846
An Act for making a Railway from the Glasgow, Barrhead, and Neilston Direct Railway to the Caledonian Railway.
Stirling and Dunfermline Railway Act 1846	9 & 10 Vict. c. ccii	16 July 1846
An Act for making a Railway from Stirling to Dunfermline, with Branches to Tillicoultry and to Alloa Harbour, to be called "The Stirling and Dunfermline Railway."
Midland Railway (No. 2) Act 1846	9 & 10 Vict. c. cciii	16 July 1846
An Act to enable the Midland Railway Company to make a Railway from Burton-upon-Trent to Nuneaton, with Branches, and to purchase the Ashby-de-la-Zouch Canal.
London and North Western Railway Act 1846	9 & 10 Vict. c. cciv	16 July 1846
An Act to consolidate the London and Birmingham, Grand Junction, and Manchester and Birmingham Railway Companies.
Eastern Counties (Epping Extension) Railway Act 1846 (repealed)	9 & 10 Vict. c. ccv	16 July 1846
An Act to enable the Eastern Counties Railway Company to make a Railway from Epping to a Point of Junction with the Colchester Line of the Eastern Counties Railway at or near the llford Station thereon. (Repealed by Great Eastern Railway Act 1862 (25 & 26 Vict. c. ccxxiii))
Wishaw and Coltness Railway (Cleland Extension) Act 1846	9 & 10 Vict. c. ccvi	16 July 1846
An Act to enable the Wishaw and Coltness Railway Company to make a Branch Railway from the Wishaw and Coltness Railway to Murdieston, with a Branch to Goodockhill.
Newcastle and Berwick Railway Act 1846	9 & 10 Vict. c. ccvii	16 July 1846
An Act for enabling the Newcastle and Berwick Railway Company to make a certain Branch Railway in the County of Northumberland.
Waterford, Wexford, Wicklow and Dublin Railway Act 1846	9 & 10 Vict. c. ccviii	16 July 1846
An Act for making a Railway and Branch Railway, to be called "The Waterford, Wexford, Wicklow, and Dublin Railway."
Templemore and Nenagh Railway Act 1846	9 & 10 Vict. c. ccix	16 July 1846
An Act for making and maintaining a Railway from Templemore to Nenagh.
Midland Great Western Railway of Ireland (Liffy Branch and Longford Deviation) Act 1846 (repealed)	9 & 10 Vict. c. ccx	16 July 1846
An Act to enable the Midland Great Western Railway of Ireland Company to make a Deviation in the authorized Line of the said Railway, and also a Branch Railway to the River Liffy. (Repealed by Statute Law (Repeals) Act 2013 (c. 2))
Kilmarnock and Troon Railway Act 1846	9 & 10 Vict. c. ccxi	16 July 1846
An Act to enable the Kilmarnock and Troon Railway Company to let on Lease their Railway to the Glasgow, Paisley, Kilmarnock, and Ayr Railway Company; and to authorize the said Glasgow, Paisley, Kilmarnock, and Ayr Railway Company to alter Parts of the said Kilmarnock and Troon Railway, and to construct certain Branch Railways in connexion therewith.
Wakefield, Pontefract and Goole Railway and Port of Goole Act 1846	9 & 10 Vict. c. ccxii	16 July 1846
An Act for empowering the Wakefield, Pontefract, and Goole Railway Company to construct a Jetty and other Works, and to provide a Station, Coal Staiths, and other Conveniences, at the Port of Goole; and for other Purposes relating to the said Port.
Dublin and Kingstown Railway Act 1846	9 & 10 Vict. c. ccxiii	16 July 1846
An Act for extending the Line of the Dublin and Kingstown Railway to the Bridge of Bray in the County of Dublin.
South Leith Parish Church Act 1846	9 & 10 Vict. c. ccxiv	16 July 1846
An Act to provide for the Repair of the Parish Church of South Leith in the County of Edinburgh, and for the Administration of the Property and Revenues thereof; to alter the existing Mode of electing a Minister to the Second Charge of the said Church and Parish; to confirm the Proceedings of the Heritors of the said Parish relating to the Purchase of a suitable House as a Manse; and to effect other Objects in connexion with the said Church and Parish.
Chard Canal and Railway Act 1846	9 & 10 Vict. c. ccxv	16 July 1846
An Act to enable the Chard Canal Company to convert into a Railway the Portion of the Chard Canal from Creech Saint Michael to Ilminster, all in the County of Somerset.
Stockton New Gas Company Act 1846 (repealed)	9 & 10 Vict. c. ccxvi	16 July 1846
An Act for lighting with Gas the Town and Borough of Stockton and other Places in the Counties of Durham and York. (Repealed by Stockton Gas Act 1857 (20 Vict. c. lii))
Worcester New Gas Light Act 1846	9 & 10 Vict. c. ccxvii	16 July 1846
An Act for better supplying with Gas the City of Worcester and the Suburbs thereof.
Yeovil Borough Market Act 1846 (repealed)	9 & 10 Vict. c. ccxviii	16 July 1846
An Act for regulating the Markets and Fairs in the Borough and Town of Yeovil in the County of Somerset (Repealed by Borough of Yeovil Extension and Improvement Act 1854 (17 & 18 Vict. c. cxxv))
Manchester Market Act 1846 or the Manchester Markets Act 1846	9 & 10 Vict. c. ccxix	16 July 1846
An Act for providing Market Places and for regulating the Markets and Fairs in the Borough of Manchester in the County Palatine of Lancaster.
Bath Water Supply Act 1846 or the Bath Act 1846	9 & 10 Vict. c. ccxx	16 July 1846
An Act for more effectually supplying with Water the City of Bath, and several Parishes and Places adjacent thereto.
Newport and Pillgwenlly Waterworks Act 1846 (repealed)	9 & 10 Vict. c. ccxxi	16 July 1846
An Act for better supplying with Water the Town and Borough of Newport in the County of Monmouth. (Repealed by Newport and Pillgwenlly Waterworks Act 1854 (17 & 18 Vict. c. cxci))
Bristol Waterworks Act 1846	9 & 10 Vict. c. ccxxii	16 July 1846
An Act for supplying with Water the City of Bristol and certain Parishes adjacent thereto in the Counties of Gloucester and Somerset.
Witham Navigation Act 1846	9 & 10 Vict. c. ccxxiii	16 July 1846
An Act to amend the Acts relating to the Witham Navigation, and to reduce the Tolls on the said Navigation.
Midland Great Western Railway of Ireland (Mullingar to Athlone) Act 1846 (repealed)	9 & 10 Vict. c. ccxxiv	16 July 1846
An Act to enable the Midland Great Western Railway of Ireland Company to make a Railway from Mullingar to Athlone. (Repealed by Statute Law (Repeals) Act 2013 (c. 2))
Aston juxta Birmingham Small Tenements Act 1846 (repealed)	9 & 10 Vict. c. ccxxv	16 July 1846
An Act for better assessing and collecting the Poor Rates, Highway Rates, Borough Rates, County Rates, Lighting, Watching, and Cleansing Rates, and all other Parochial Rates, on small Tenements, in the Parish o£ Aston juxta Birmingham in the County of Warwick. (Repealed by Local Government Board's Provisional Order Confirmation (No. 13) Act 1891 (54 & 55 Vict. c. clxi))
Parish Schoolmasters' Dependents (Scotland) Act 1846 (repealed)	9 & 10 Vict. c. ccxxvi	16 July 1846
An Act for better raising and more securely constituting the Fund for the Relief of Widows and Children of Burgh and Parochial Schoolmasters in Scotland. (Repealed by Burgh and Parochial Schoolmasters' Widows' Fund (Scotland) Order Confirmation Act 1913 (3 & 4 Geo. 5. c. xxvii))
Banff, Aberdeen and Elgin Roads and Spey Bridges Act 1846	9 & 10 Vict. c. ccxxvii	16 July 1846
An Act for more effectually maintaining and repairing certain Roads in the Counties of Banff, Aberdeen, and Elgin.
Dundee and Perth Railway (Amendment) Act 1846	9 & 10 Vict. c. ccxxviii	27 July 1846
An Act to enable the Dundee and Perth Railway Company to alter their Line at Inchyra and Lairwell, and to extend the same towards the Penitentiary at Perth.
Caledonian Railway (Glasgow, Garnkirk and Coatbridge Branch) Act 1846	9 & 10 Vict. c. ccxxix	27 July 1846
An Act to enable the Caledonian Railway Company to make Branch Railways from the Castlecary Branch of the Caledonian Railway to the Glasgow, Garnkirk, and Coatbridge Railway.
Sheffield, Ashton-under-Lyne and Manchester Railway (Whaley Bridge and Hayfield Branches) Act 1846 (repealed)	9 & 10 Vict. c. ccxxx	27 July 1846
An Act for enabling the Sheffield, Ashton-under-Lyne, and Manchester Railway Company to make Branch Railways from or in connexion with their Main Line of Railway to Whaley Bridge and Hayfield, to be called "The Whaley Bridge and Hayfield Branches." (Repealed by Manchester, Sheffield and Lincolnshire Railway Act 1849 (12 & 13 Vict. c. lxxxi))
North Union Railways Purchase Act 1846	9 & 10 Vict. c. ccxxxi	27 July 1846
An Act for vesting in the Grand Junction Railway Company and the Manchester and Leeds Railway Company the North Union Railway, and all the Works, Property, and Effects appertaining thereto.
Birmingham, Lichfield and Manchester Railway Act 1846	9 & 10 Vict. c. ccxxxii	27 July 1846
An Act for making a Railway from Birmingham to Lichfield, to be called "The Birmingham, Lichfield, and Manchester Railway."
Buckinghamshire Railway (Buckingham and Brackley Junction) Act 1846	9 & 10 Vict. c. ccxxxiii	27 July 1846
An Act for making a Railway from the Oxford and Bletchley Junction Railway to Buckingham and Brackley.
London and Croydon Railway Act 1846	9 & 10 Vict. c. ccxxxiv	27 July 1846
An Act to enable the London and Croydon Railway Company to construct a Branch to Deptford; and for amending the Acts relating to such Railway.
Durham and Sunderland Railway and Wearmouth Dock Purchases Act 1846	9 & 10 Vict. c. ccxxxv	27 July 1846
An Act for enabling the Newcastle and Darlington Junction Railway Company to purchase the Durham and Sunderland Railway and the Wearmouth Dock.
Wycombe Railway Act 1846	9 & 10 Vict. c. ccxxxvi	27 July 1846
An Act for making a Railway from the Great Western Railway at Maidenhead in Berkshire to the Town of High Wycombe in the County of Buckingham.
Ayrshire and Bridge of Weir Railway Act 1846	9 & 10 Vict. c. ccxxxvii	27 July 1846
An Act for making a Railway from Johnstone to the Bridge of Weir, with a Branch to Kilbarchan, to be called "The Ayrshire and Bridge of Weir Railway."
Ashburton, Newton and South Devon Railway Act 1846	9 & 10 Vict. c. ccxxxviii	27 July 1846
An Act for making a Railway from Ashburton in the County of Devon to join the South Devon Railway.
South Wales Railway Amendment Act 1846	9 & 10 Vict. c. ccxxxix	27 July 1846
An Act for extending the Line of the South Wales Railway, and for making certain Alterations of the said Railway, and certain Branch Railways in connexion therewith.
Gloucester and Dean Forest Railway Act 1846	9 & 10 Vict. c. ccxl	27 July 1846
An Act for making a Railway from Gloucester to the Monmouth and Hereford Railway, and to the South Wales Railway at Awre, to be called "The Gloucester and Dean Forest Railway."
Hull and Selby Railway Company's Purchase Act 1846	9 & 10 Vict. c. ccxli	27 July 1846
An Act for enabling the Hull and Selby Railway Company to lease and also to sell their Railway to the York and North Midland and Manchester and Leeds Railway Companies, or one of them; and to authorize the raising of additional Money by both or either of the last-mentioned Companies for those and other Purposes.
Great North of England Railway Company's Purchase Act 1846 or the Great North of England Railway Purchase Act 1846	9 & 10 Vict. c. ccxlii	27 July 1846
An Act for enabling the Great North of England Railway Company to lease and also to sell their Railway to the Newcastle and Darlington Junction Railway Company; and to authorize the raising of additional Money by the said last-mentioned Company for those and other Purposes.
Midland Railway (Leicester and Swannington Railway Purchase) Act 1846	9 & 10 Vict. c. ccxliii	27 July 1846
An Act for vesting the Leicester and Swannington Railway in the Midland Railway Company.
London and Birmingham Railway and Birmingham Canal Arrangement Act 1846	9 & 10 Vict. c. ccxliv	27 July 1846
An Act for carrying into effect certain Arrangements between the London and Birmingham Railway Company and the Company of Proprietors of the Birmingham Canal Navigations, and for granting certain Powers to the said respective Companies.
Newry, Warrenpoint and Rostrevor Railway Act 1846	9 & 10 Vict. c. ccxlv	27 July 1846
An Act for making a Railway from Newry in the Counties of Armagh and Down to Rostrevor in the County of Down, with a Branch to Warrenpoint in the same County.
Fleetwood, Preston and West Riding Junction Railway Act 1846	9 & 10 Vict. c. ccxlvi	27 July 1846
An Act for making a Railway from Preston in the County Palatine of Lancaster to Clitheroe in the same County Palatine.
York and North Midland Railway (Widening and Enlargement) Act 1846	9 & 10 Vict. c. ccxlvii	27 July 1846
An Act to authorize the widening and Enlargement of Part of the Line of the York and North Midland Railway, or the Construction and Maintenance of a Railway adjoining thereto.
London and Birmingham Railway (No. 3) Act 1846	9 & 10 Vict. c. ccxlviii	27 July 1846
An Act to empower the London and Birmingham Railway Company to extend their Line at Leamington, and to enlarge their Stations at Coventry and Rugby; and for other Purposes.
Caledonian Railway (Carlisle Deviation) Act 1846	9 & 10 Vict. c. ccxlix	27 July 1846
An Act to enable the Caledonian Railway Company to deviate the Line of the said Railway in the Vicinity of Carlisle.
North Wales Mineral Railway Deviation and Branches Act 1846	9 & 10 Vict. c. ccl	27 July 1846
An Act to authorize the North Wales Mineral Railway Company to make certain Branches, and also to make a Deviation in their present Line of Railway.
Shrewsbury and Chester Railway Act 1846	9 & 10 Vict. c. ccli	27 July 1846
An Act for the Consolidation of the Shrewsbury, Oswestry, and Chester Junction and the North Wales Mineral Railway Companies.
Guildford Extension and Portsmouth and Fareham Railway Act 1846	9 & 10 Vict. c. cclii	27 July 1846
An Act for authorizing the Sale of the Guildford Junction Railway, and for enabling the Purchasers to maintain the same, and to make and maintain a Railway therefrom to Godalming, and from the London and South-western Railway at Fareham to Portsmouth.
Coventry, Nuneaton, Birmingham and Leicester Railway Act 1846	9 & 10 Vict. c. ccliii	27 July 1846
An Act for making a Railway from the Trent Valley Railway near Nuneaton to the Midland Railway in the Parish of Wigston Magna in the County of Leicester, to be called "The Coventry, Nuneaton, Birmingham, and Leicester Railway."
Midland Railway (Birmingham Extension) Act 1846	9 & 10 Vict. c. ccliv	27 July 1846
An Act to empower the Midland Railway Company to extend their Line at Birmingham; and for other Purposes.
Midland Railway (Oakham Canal Purchase) Act 1846	9 & 10 Vict. c. cclv	27 July 1846
An Act to authorize the Purchase of the Oakham Canal by the Midland Railway Company.
Tenby, Saundersfoot and South Wales Railway Act 1846	9 & 10 Vict. c. cclvi	27 July 1846
An Act for making a Railway to connect the Saundersfoot Railway with the South Wales Railway, with the Harbour of Saundersfoot, and with the Town of Tenby, to be called "The Tenby, Saundersfoot, and South Wales Railway;" and for other Purposes.
Lancaster and Carlisle Railway Act 1846	9 & 10 Vict. c. cclvii	27 July 1846
An Act to enable the Lancaster and Carlisle Railway Company to extend and enlarge their Stations and extend their Railway at Carlisle; and for other Purposes.
Eastern Counties Railway (Stations Enlargement) Act 1846	9 & 10 Vict. c. cclviii	27 July 1846
An Act to enable the Eastern Counties Railway Company to enlarge their Stations in London and at Stratford; and for other Purposes.
Huddersfield and Manchester Railway and Canal (Huddersfield Diversion and Cooper Bridge Branch) Act 1846	9 & 10 Vict. c. cclix	27 July 1846
An Act for enabling the Huddersfield and Manchester Railway and Canal Company to divert their Main Line of Railway in Huddersfield, and to make a Branch therefrom near Cooper Bridge in the Township of Huddersfield.
Northern Counties Union Railway Act 1846	9 & 10 Vict. c. cclx	27 July 1846
An Act for making a Railway from the Great North of England Railway at Thirsk in the North Riding of Yorkshire to the Lancaster and Carlisle Railway at Clifton in Westmorland, and a Railway from Bishop Auckland in the County of Durham to the Lancaster and Carlisle Railway at Tebay in Westmorland, to be called "The Northern Counties Union Railway."
Grand Junction Railway (No. 2) Act 1846	9 & 10 Vict. c. cclxi	27 July 1846
An Act for enabling the Grand Junction Railway Company to make certain Branch Lines of Railway, to be called "The Huyton and Aston Branch;" "The Huyton, Prescot, and Saint Helens Branch," "The Warrington and Kenyan Branch," "The Warrington and Parkside Branch," and "The Edgehill and Huyton Branch;" and for amending the former Acts relating to the said Company.
Leeds, Dewsbury and Manchester Railway (Deviations and Branches) Act 1846	9 & 10 Vict. c. cclxii	27 July 1846
An Act for altering, amending, and enlarging the Powers of the Leeds, Dewsbury, and Manchester Railway Act, 1845, (Note: Leeds, Dewsbury and Manchester Railway Act 1845 (8 & 9 Vict. c. xxxvi)) and for authorizing certain Deviations from the Line and Levels of the said Railway, and for making and maintaining certain Branches and Extensions therefrom.
Glasgow, Airdrie and Monklands Junction Railway Act 1846	9 & 10 Vict. c. cclxiii	27 July 1846
An Act for making a Railway from Glasgow to Airdrie, with Branches to the Clydesdale Junction Railway and to Mile End, to be called "The Glasgow, Airdrie, and Monklands Junction Railway."
Newcastle and Darlington Junction (County of Durham Branches) Railway Act 1846	9 & 10 Vict. c. cclxiv	27 July 1846
An Act for enabling the Newcastle and Darlington Junction Railway Company to make certain Branch Railways in the County of Durham; and for other Purposes.
Blackburn, Clitheroe and North Western Junction Railway Act 1846	9 & 10 Vict. c. cclxv	27 July 1846
An Act for making a Bailvray, with Branches therefrom, in the County of Lancaster and West Riding of the County of York, to be called "The Blackburn, Clitheroe and North-western Junction Railway."
Blackburn and Preston Railway Act 1846	9 & 10 Vict. c. cclxvi	27 July 1846
An Act for making certain Branches from the Line of the Blackburn and Preston Railway in the County of Lancaster; and for amending the Acts relating thereto.
Sheffield, Ashton-under-Lyne and Manchester Railway Act 1846	9 & 10 Vict. c. cclxvii	27 July 1846
An Act for vesting in the Sheffield, Ashton-under-Lyne, and Manchester Railway Company the Peak Forest Canal and the Macclesfield Canal.
Manchester, Sheffield and Lincolnshire Railway Act 1846 (repealed)	9 & 10 Vict. c. cclxviii	27 July 1846
An Act to amalgamate the Sheffield, Ashton-under-Lyne, and Manchester Railway Company, the Sheffield and Lincolnshire Junction, the Sheffield and Lincolnshire Extension; and the Great Grimsby and Sheffield Railway Companies, and the Grimsby Dock Company. (Repealed by Manchester, Sheffield and Lincolnshire Railway Act 1849 (12 & 13 Vict. c. lxxxi))
Birmingham and Dudley Canal Consolidation Act 1846	9 & 10 Vict. c. cclxix	27 July 1846
An Act for consolidating the Dudley Canal Navigation with the Birmingham Canal Navigations; and for other Purposes.
Ely and Huntingdon Railway Act 1846 (repealed)	9 & 10 Vict. c. cclxx	27 July 1846
An Act to amend the Ely and Huntingdon Railway Act. (Note: Ely and Huntingdon Railway Act 1845 (8 & 9 Vict. c. xlviii)) (Repealed by Great Eastern Railway Act 1862 (25 & 26 Vict. c. ccxxiii))
Manchester, Bolton and Bury Canal and Railway (No. 2) Act 1846	9 & 10 Vict. c. cclxxi	27 July 1846
An Act to enable the Company of Proprietors of the Manchester, Bolton, and Bury Canal Navigation and Railway to raise an additional Sum of Money; and to amend the Acts relating to that Company.
Leeds and Bradford Railway (Alteration of Levels in Bingley) Act 1846	9 & 10 Vict. c. cclxxii	27 July 1846
An Act for enabling the Leeds and Bradford Railway Company to alter the Levels of a Portion of the Line of their Railway in the Parish of Bingley in the West Riding of the County of York.
London and Blackwall Railway Act 1846	9 & 10 Vict. c. cclxxiii	27 July 1846
An Act for widening the Line of "The London and Blackwall Railway;" and for amending the Acts relating to the said Railway.
Shrewsbury, Oswestry and Chester Railway (Crickheath and Wem Branches) Act 1846	9 & 10 Vict. c. cclxxiv	27 July 1846
An Act to authorize the Shrewsbury, Oswestry, and Chester Junction Railway Company to make Railways to Crickheath and Wem, and to raise additional Capital for those Purposes.
Shrewsbury, Oswestry and Chester Railway (Extension and Deviation) Act 1846	9 & 10 Vict. c. cclxxv	27 July 1846
An Act to authorize the Shrewsbury, Oswestry and Chester Junction Railway Company to make an Extension into Shrewsbury, and certain Alterations and Deviations in their Line of Railway.
East Lancashire Deviation and Branch Railways Act 1846	9 & 10 Vict. c. cclxxvi	27 July 1846
An Act to enable the East Lancashire Railway Company to alter the Line and Levels of such Railway, and to make Branches therefrom; and for other Purposes relating thereto.
Manchester and Leeds Railway Act 1846 or the Huddersfield and Sheffield Junction and Manchester and Leeds Railways Act 1846	9 & 10 Vict. c. cclxxvii	27 July 1846
An Act to incorporate the Huddersfield and Sheffield Junction Railway Company with the Manchester and Leeds Railway Company.
Oxford, Worcester and Wolverhampton Railway (Amendment) Act 1846	9 & 10 Vict. c. cclxxviii	27 July 1846
An Act to authorize certain Alterations in the Line of the Oxford, Worcester, and Wolverhampton Railway; and to amend the Act (Note: Oxford, Worcester and Wolverhampton Railway Act 1845 (8 & 9 Vict. c. clxxxiv)) relating thereto.
Furness Railway Extensions Act 1846 (repealed)	9 & 10 Vict. c. cclxxix	27 July 1846
An Act to enable the Furness Railway Company to extend their Line to Broughton and to Ulverstone, and to make certain Branches therefrom; and to amend the Act (Note: Furness Railway Act 1844 7 & 8 Vict. (c. xxii)) relating thereto. (Repealed by Furness Railway Act 1855 (18 & 19 Vict. c. clxxiii))
Ipswich and Bury Railway (Norwich Extension) Act 1846 (repealed)	9 & 10 Vict. c. cclxxx	27 July 1846
An Act to amend "The Ipswich and Bury Saint Edmunds Railway Act, 1845;" (Note: Ipswich and Bury St. Edmunds Railway Act 1845 (8 & 9 Vict. c. xcvii)) and for making a Railway from the said Ipswich and Bury Saint Edmunds Railway to Norwich, with a Branch therefrom. (Repealed by Great Eastern Railway Act 1862 (25 & 26 Vict. c. ccxxiii))
London and Brighton Railway (Wandsworth Branch) Act 1846	9 & 10 Vict. c. cclxxxi	27 July 1846
An Act for making a Branch Railway from the London and Brighton Railway in the Parish of Croydon to join the South-western Railway in the Parish of Wandsworth in the County of Surrey.
Manchester and Leeds Railway (No. 2) Act 1846 or the Liverpool and Bury and Manchester and Leeds Railways Act 1846	9 & 10 Vict. c. cclxxxii	27 July 1846
An Act to incorporate the Liverpool and Bury Railway Company with the Manchester and Leeds Railway Company.
London and Brighton Railway Act 1846	9 & 10 Vict. c. cclxxxiii	27 July 1846
An Act to consolidate and unite the London and Brighton and the London and Croydon Railway Companies and the Undertakings belonging to them.
Sheffield General Cemetery Act 1846	9 & 10 Vict. c. cclxxxiv	27 July 1846
An Act for incorporating the Proprietors of the Sheffield General Cemetery in the Township of Ecclesall Bierlow in the Parish of Sheffield in the West Riding of the County of York, and for enlarging and improving the said Cemetery; and for other Purposes connected therewith.
Kilmarnock Waterworks Act 1846 (repealed)	9 & 10 Vict. c. cclxxxv	27 July 1846
An Act for supplying with Water the Town of Kilmarnock, Suburbs thereof, and Places acyacent. (Repealed by Kilmarnock Water Company's Act 1866 (29 & 30 Vict. c. clxxxviii))
Heywood Waterworks Act 1846 (repealed)	9 & 10 Vict. c. cclxxxvi	27 July 1846
An Act for the better supplying with Water the Town or Village of Heywood, and Places adjacent thereto, in the County Palatine of Lancaster. (Repealed by Heywood Waterworks Amendment Act 1855 (18 & 19 Vict. c. xx))
Chorley Waterworks Act 1846	9 & 10 Vict. c. cclxxxvii	27 July 1846
An Act for better supplying with Water the Town and Parish of Charley in the County Palatine of Lancaster.
Airdrie and Coatbridge Waterworks Act 1846 (repealed)	9 & 10 Vict. c. cclxxxviii	27 July 1846
An Act for supplying with Water the Towns of Airdrie and Coatbridge, and Places adjacent, in the County of Lanark. (Repealed by Airdrie, Coatbridge and District Water Board Order Confirmation Act 1923 (13 & 14 Geo. 5. c. li))
Glasgow City Act 1846	9 & 10 Vict. c. cclxxxix	27 July 1846
An Act to extend the Municipal Boundaries of the City of Glasgow; to amend the Acts relating to the Police and Statute Labour of the said City and adjoining Districts; and for other Purposes in relation to the Municipality and Police of the said City.
Cromford Canal Sale Act 1846	9 & 10 Vict. c. ccxc	27 July 1846
An Act authorizing the Sale of the Cromford Canal and other Property of the Cromford Canal Company.
Severn Navigation Act 1846	9 & 10 Vict. c. ccxci	27 July 1846
An Act to alter and extend the Provisions of the Acts for improving the Navigation of the River Severn.
Waterford Harbour Act 1846	9 & 10 Vict. c. ccxcii	27 July 1846
An Act for improving, preserving, maintaining, and better regulating the Port and Harbour of Waterford; and for other Purposes relating thereto.
Bury Improvement Act 1846	9 & 10 Vict. c. ccxciii	27 July 1846
An Act for better lighting, paving, cleansing, draining, regulating, and improving the Borough of Bury in the County Palatine of Lancaster, and for otherwise promoting the Health and Convenience of the Inhabitants.
Belfast Gas and Improvement Act 1846	9 & 10 Vict. c. ccxciv	27 July 1846
An Act for better lighting and improving the Borough of Belfast.
Wath-upon-Dearne Improvement Act 1846 (repealed)	9 & 10 Vict. c. ccxcv	27 July 1846
An Act for paving, lighting, cleansing, and otherwise improving the Town of Wath-upon-Dearne in the County of York, and for removing and preventing Nuisances and Annoyances therein. (Repealed by Statute Law (Repeals) Act 1989 (c. 43))
Pow of Inchaffray Drainage Act 1846 (repealed)	9 & 10 Vict. c. ccxcvi	27 July 1846
An Act for repealing an Act of the Parliament of Scotland passed in the Sixth Session of the First Parliament of King William (1696), intituled "An Act in favours of the Heritors adjacent to the Pow of Inchaffray;" (Note: 1696 not numbered (S)) and for more effectually draining and improving Lands adjacent to the River or Stream called the Pow of Inchaffray, in the County of Perth. (Repealed by Pow of Inchaffray Drainage Commission (Scotland) Act 2019 (asp 2))
Black Sluice Drainage Act 1846	9 & 10 Vict. c. ccxcvii	27 July 1846
An Act for better draining and improving certain Low, Marsh, and Fen Lands lying between Boston Haven and Bourn in the County of Lincoln, and for further improving the Navigation through such Lands.
Lough Swilly and Lough Foyle Drainage Act 1846	9 & 10 Vict. c. ccxcviii	27 July 1846
An Act for amending Two several Acts passed respectively in the Second and Seventh Years of the Reign of Her present Majesty, for draining and embanking certain Lands in Longh Swilly and Lottgh Foyle in the Counties of Donegal and Londonderry.
Rothesay Burgh Act 1846	9 & 10 Vict. c. ccxcix	27 July 1846
An Act for regulating the Municipal Government and Police of the Royal Burgh of Rothesay.
South Staffordshire Junction Railway Act 1846	9 & 10 Vict. c. ccc	3 August 1846
An Act for making a Railway, to be called "The South Staffordshire Junction Railway," with Branches.
Leeds and Bradford Railway (Junction Line at Bradford) Act 1846	9 & 10 Vict. c. ccci	3 August 1846
An Act for enabling the Leeds and Bradford Railway Company to make a Junction Line at Bradford in the West Riding of the County of York.
East Lancashire Railway Amalgamation Act 1846	9 & 10 Vict. c. cccii	3 August 1846
An Act to unite and consolidate the Blackburn and Preston Railway Company with the East Lancashire Railway Company.
Newport, Abergavenny and Hereford Railway Act 1846	9 & 10 Vict. c. ccciii	3 August 1846
An Act for making a Railway from Newport to Abergavenny and Hereford, with Branches therefrom.
Sheffield and Lincolnshire Junction Railway Act 1846 (repealed)	9 & 10 Vict. c. ccciv	3 August 1846
An Act for making a Railway from Sheffield to Gainsborough, with Branches. (Repealed by Manchester, Sheffield and Lincolnshire Railway Act 1849 (12 & 13 Vict. c. lxxxi))
South Eastern Railway (No. 3) Act 1846	9 & 10 Vict. c. cccv	3 August 1846
An Act to enable the South-eastern Railway Company to make a Railway from the London and Greenwich Railway to Woolwich and Gravesend.
Manchester and Leeds Railway (No. 3) Act 1846	9 & 10 Vict. c. cccvi	3 August 1846
An Act to enable the Manchester and Leeds Railway Company to make several Branch Railways, and to authorize the Amalgamation of the Preston and Wyre Railway, Harbour, and Dock Company with the Manchester and Leeds Railway Company.
Shrewsbury and Birmingham Railway Act 1846	9 & 10 Vict. c. cccvii	3 August 1846
An Act for making a Railway from Shrewsbury to Wolverhampton, with a Branch, to be called "The Shrewsbury and Birmingham Railway."
Shrewsbury, Wolverhampton and South Staffordshire Junction Railway Act 1846	9 & 10 Vict. c. cccviii	3 August 1846
An Act for making a Railway from Shrewsbury to Wolverhampton, to be called "The Shrewsbury, Wolverhampton, and South Staffordshire Junction Railway."
London and Birmingham Railway (Weedon and Northampton Branch) Act 1846	9 & 10 Vict. c. cccix	3 August 1846
An Act to empower the London and Birmingham Railway Company to make a Branch from the said Railway to the Blisworth and Peterborough Branch thereof.
Blackburn, Darwen and Bolton Railway Act 1846	9 & 10 Vict. c. cccx	3 August 1846
An Act to enable the Blackburn, Darwen, and Bolton Railway Company to alter the Line of Part of their Railway.
Midland Railway (Leicester and Swannington Alteration and Branches) Act 1846	9 & 10 Vict. c. cccxi	3 August 1846
An Act for enabling the Midland Railway Company to alter a Portion of the Leicester and Swannington Railway, and to make certain Branches.
Liverpool and Bury Railway Act 1846	9 & 10 Vict. c. cccxii	3 August 1846
An Act for amending the Act (Note: Liverpool and Bury Railway Act 1845 (8 & 9 Vict. c. clxvi)) relating to the Liverpool and Bury Railway, and for making Branches therefrom.
Wilts, Somerset and Weymouth Railway (Amendment) Act 1846	9 & 10 Vict. c. cccxiii	3 August 1846
An Act to authorise certain Alterations and Extensions of the line of the Wilts, Somerset, and Weymouth Railway.
Caledonian Railway (Glasgow Termini and Branches) Act 1846	9 & 10 Vict. c. cccxiv	3 August 1846
An Act to enable the Caledonian Railway Company to form certain Branch and Terminal Railways in the Vicinity of Glasgow.
Birmingham, Wolverhampton and Dudley Railway Act 1846	9 & 10 Vict. c. cccxv	3 August 1846
An Act for making Railways from Birmingham to Wolverhampton and Dudley, to be called "The Birmingham, Wolverhampton, and Dudley Railway."
Trent Valley, Midlands and Grand Junction Railway Act 1846	9 & 10 Vict. c. cccxvi	3 August 1846
An Act for making a Railway from Walsall in the County of Stafford to the Midland Railways at Wichnor Forge in Tatenhill, to be called "The Trent Valley, Midlands, and Grand Junction Railway."
Strathtay and Breadalbane Railway Act 1846	9 & 10 Vict. c. cccxvii	3 August 1846
An Act for making a Railway from the Line of the Perth and Inverness Railway to Aberfeldy, to be called "The Strathtay and Breadalbane Railway."
Londonderry and Enniskillen Railway Amendment Act 1846 (repealed)	9 & 10 Vict. c. cccxviii	3 August 1846
An Act to enable the Londonderry and Enniskillen Railway Company to alter and extend the Line of such Railway, to make a Branch therefrom to the Town of Omagh, and to amend the Act (Note: Londonderry and Enniskillen Railway Act 1845 (8 & 9 Vict. c. xcviii)) relating thereto. (Repealed by Londonderry and Enniskillen Railway Consolidation Act 1852 (15 & 16 Vict. c. xliv))
Sheffield and Lincolnshire Extension Railway Act 1846 (repealed)	9 & 10 Vict. c. cccxix	3 August 1846
An Act for making a Railway from the proposed Sheffield and Lincolnshire Junction Railway to the City of Lincoln. (Repealed by Manchester, Sheffield and Lincolnshire Railway Act 1849 (12 & 13 Vict. c. lxxxi))
Whitehaven and Furness Junction Railway (Whitehaven Extension and Kirksanton Deviation) Act 1846	9 & 10 Vict. c. cccxx	3 August 1846
An Act to enable the Whitehaven and Furness Junction Railway Company to make a Railway in deviation from their Line of Railway, and to construct an Extension thereof to a Point of Junction with the Whitehaven Junction Railway.
Dublin, Belfast and Coleraine Junction Railway Act 1846	9 & 10 Vict. c. cccxxi	3 August 1846
An Act for making a Railway from Armagh to Portrush, with Branches to Randalstown and Ballymoney.
Shropshire Union Railways and Canal (Chester and Wolverhampton Line) Act 1846	9 & 10 Vict. c. cccxxii	3 August 1846
An Act for making a Railway from the Chester and Crewe Branch of the Grand Junction Railway at Calveley to Wolverhampton; and for other Purposes connected therewith.
Shropshire Union Railways and Canal (Shrewsbury and Stafford Railway) Act 1846	9 & 10 Vict. c. cccxxiii	3 August 1846
An Act for making a Railway from Shrewsbury to Stafford, with a Branch to Stone; and for other Purposes.
Shropshire Union Railways and Canal (Newton to Crewe with Branches) Act 1846	9 & 10 Vict. c. cccxxiv	3 August 1846
An Act for making a Railway from Newtown in the County of Montgomery to Crewe in the County of Chester, with Branches; and for other Purposes connected therewith.
Shrewsbury and Hereford Railway Act 1846 (repealed)	9 & 10 Vict. c. cccxxv	3 August 1846
An Act for making a Railway from Shrewsbury to Hereford, to be called "The Shrewsbury and Hereford Railway." (Repealed by Shrewsbury and Hereford Railway Act 1856 (19 & 20 Vict. c. xlvii))
Bristol and Birmingham and Midland Railways Act 1846	9 & 10 Vict. c. cccxxvi	3 August 1846
An Act to consolidate the Bristol and Gloucester and Birmingham and Gloucester Railway Companies with the Midland Railway Company.
North Wales Railway Amendment Act 1846	9 & 10 Vict. c. cccxxvii	3 August 1846
An Act to alter and amend the North Wales Railway Act, One thousand eight hundred and forty-five. (Note: North Wales Railway Act 1845 (8 & 9 Vict. c. cvi))
Birmingham, Wolverhampton and Stour Valley Railway (Birmingham, Wolverhampton and Dudley Lines) Act 1846	9 & 10 Vict. c. cccxxviii	3 August 1846
An Act for making a Railway from Birmingham to Wolverhampton, and to the Grand Junction Railway in the Parish of Bushbury, with a Branch to Dudley.
Caledonian Railway (Glasgow, Garnkirk and Coatbridge Railway Purchase) Act 1846	9 & 10 Vict. c. cccxxix	3 August 1846
An Act to effectuate the Sale of the Glasgow, Garnkirk, and Coatbridge Railway Company of the said Railway to the Caledonian Railway Company; and other Purposes therewith connected.
Newcastle and Darlington Junction Railway Act 1846	9 & 10 Vict. c. cccxxx	3 August 1846
An Act for authorizing the Sale of the Pontop and South Shields Railway to the Newcastle and Darlington Junction Railway Company.
London and Birmingham Railway (Coventry and Nuneaton Railway) Act 1846	9 & 10 Vict. c. cccxxxi	3 August 1846
An Act to empower the London and Birmingham Railway Company to make a Branch Railway from the London and Birmingham Railway near Coventry to the Trent Valley Railway in the Parish of Nuneaton.
Edinburgh and Bathgate Railway Act 1846	9 & 10 Vict. c. cccxxxii	3 August 1846
An Act for making a Railway from the Edinburgh and Glasgow Railway to Bathgate, with Branches, to be called "The Edinburgh and Bathgate Railway."
Surrey Iron Railway Act 1846	9 & 10 Vict. c. cccxxxiii	3 August 1846
An Act to enable the Surrey Iron Railway Company to sell the Lands, Houses, and other Property of the Company, together with the navigable Communication from the Dock of the Company to the River Thames at Wandsworth in the County of Surrey, and to dissolve the said Company.
Glasgow, Garnkirk and Coatbridge Railway Extension Act 1846	9 & 10 Vict. c. cccxxxiv	3 August 1846
An Act to enable the Glasgow, Garnkirk, and Coatbridge Railway Company to extend the Terminus of their Railway in Glasgow.
Cornwall Railway Act 1846 (repealed)	9 & 10 Vict. c. cccxxxv	3 August 1846
An Act for making a Railway and other Works from Plymouth to Falmouth and other Places in the County of Cornwall, to be called "The Cornwall Railway." (Repealed by Cornwall Railway Act 1861 (24 & 25 Vict. c. ccxv))
West Cornwall Railway Act 1846	9 & 10 Vict. c. cccxxxvi	3 August 1846
An Act for making a Railway from the Parish of Kenwyn in the County of Cornwall to Penzance in the same County, with Branches, to be called "The West Cornwall Railway."
Birmingham and Oxford Junction Railway Act 1846	9 & 10 Vict. c. cccxxxvii	3 August 1846
An Act for making a Railway from Birmingham, to join the Lines of the proposed Oxford and Rugby and Oxford, Worcester, and Wolverhampton Railways, and to be called "The Birmingham and Oxford Junction Railway."
Birmingham and Oxford Junction Railway (Birmingham Extension Railway) Act 1846	9 & 10 Vict. c. cccxxxviii	3 August 1846
An Act for making a Railway into Birmingham in extension of the proposed Birmingham and Oxford Junction Railway.
South Eastern Railway (No. 4) Act 1846	9 & 10 Vict. c. cccxxxix	3 August 1846
An Act to authorize the Purchase of the Gravesend and Rochester Railway and Canal by the South-eastern Railway Company.
Midland Railway (No. 3) Act 1846	9 & 10 Vict. c. cccxl	3 August 1846
An Act for making a Railway from the Birmingham and Gloucester Railway at Kings Norton in the County of Worcester to Hales Owen in the same County.
Vale of Neath Railway Act 1846	9 & 10 Vict. c. cccxli	3 August 1846
An Act for making a Railway from the South Wales Railway, at or near to the Town of Neath, to Merthyr Tidvil, with Branches, to be called "The Vale of Neath Railway."
Cockermouth and Workington Extension Railway Act 1846	9 & 10 Vict. c. cccxlii	3 August 1846
An Act for making a Railway from the Borough of Cockermouth to the Town of Keswick, all in the County of Cumberland, to be called "The Cockermouth and Workington Extension Railway."
Sligo and Shannon Railway Act 1846	9 & 10 Vict. c. cccxliii	3 August 1846
An Act for making a Railway from Lough Allen to Lough Gill, both in the County of Leitrim, to be called "The Sligo and Shannon Railway."
Portbury Pier and Railway Act 1846	9 & 10 Vict. c. cccxliv	3 August 1846
An Act for constructing a Pier at Portsbury in the County of Somerset, and for making a Railway from the same to the City of Bristol, with a Branch Railway connected therewith.
Cambridge Improvement Act 1846 (repealed)	9 & 10 Vict. c. cccxlv	3 August 1846
An Act to amend the Cambridge Improvement Acts, and to exempt the Eastern Counties Railway Company from certain Tolls thereby imposed. (Repealed by Local Government Board's Provisional Orders Confirmation (No. 15) Act 1889 (52 & 53 Vict. c. cxvi))
Billingsgate Market Act 1846	9 & 10 Vict. c. cccxlvi	3 August 1846
An Act to repeal, alter, and amend the several Acts relating to Billingsgate Market in the City of London.
Gorbals Gravitation Water Company Act 1846	9 & 10 Vict. c. cccxlvii	3 August 1846
An Act for further and better supplying with Water the Barony or Regality of Gorbals and Places adjacent.
Sheffield Streets Act 1846	9 & 10 Vict. c. cccxlviii	3 August 1846
An Act for making certain new Streets or Thoroughfares, and widening and improving certain other Streets or Thoroughfares, within the Town and Borough of Sheffield in the County of York.
Tunbridge Wells Improvement Act 1846 (repealed)	9 & 10 Vict. c. cccxlix	3 August 1846
An Act for paving, lighting, watching, cleansing, regulating, and otherwise improving the Town of Tunbridge Wells in the Counties of Kent and Sussex. (Repealed by County of Kent Act 1981 (c. xviii))
Surrey Roads Act 1846 (repealed)	9 & 10 Vict. c. cccl	3 August 1846
An Act to repeal an Act of the Fifty-second Year of the Reign of King George the Third; (Note: Lambeth, Clapham and Battersea Roads Act 1812 (52 Geo. 3. c. cxii)) for lighting and watching the Road leading from Newington Butts to the Nag's Head on the Wandsworth Road, and other Places communicating therewith, in Lambeth, Clapham, and Battersea in Surrey; and for making other Provisions for lighting and improving the said Road, and other Places adjacent or near thereto. (Repealed by London Government (Borough of Battersea) Order in Council 1901 (SR&O 1901/211), London Government (Borough of Lambeth) Order in Council 1901 (SR&O 1901/219), and London Government (Borough of Wandsworth) Order in Council 1901 (SR&O 1901/222))
Australian Agricultural Company Act 1846 (repealed)	9 & 10 Vict. c. cccli	7 August 1846
An Act to amend an Act passed in the Fifth Year of the Reign of His Majesty King George the Fourth, (Note: Australian Agricultural Company Act 1824 (5 Geo. 4. c. 86)) for granting certain Powers and Authorities to the Australian Agricultural Company. (Repealed by Australian Agricultural Company Act 1912 (2 & 3 Geo. 5. c. xlviii))
Stamford and Spalding Railway Act 1846	9 & 10 Vict. c. ccclii	7 August 1846
An Act for making a Railway from the intended Great Northern Railway in the Parish of Ufford in the County of Northampton, to unite with the Loop Line of the same Railway in the Parish of Crowland in Lincolnshire.
Llynvi Valley Railway Act 1846 (repealed)	9 & 10 Vict. c. cccliii	7 August 1846
An Act for making a Railway from Llangynwyd to Margam, by a Company to be called "The Llynvi Valley Railway Company." (Repealed by Llynvi Valley Railway Act 1855 (18 & 19 Vict. c. l))
Sheffield, Rotherham, Barnsley, Wakefield, Huddersfield, and Goole Railway Act 1846	9 & 10 Vict. c. cccliv	7 August 1846
An Act for making certain lines of Railway in the West Riding of the County of York, to be called "The Sheffield, Rotherham, Bamsley, Wakefield, Huddersfield, and Goole Railway."
Taw Vale Railway and Dock Act 1846	9 & 10 Vict. c. ccclv	7 August 1846
An Act for amending the Acts relating to the Taw Vale Railway and Dock, and for making an Extension therefrom to the Exeter and Crediton Railway in the County of Devon.
Wisbech, St. Ives and Cambridge Junction Railway Act 1846 (repealed)	9 & 10 Vict. c. ccclvi	7 August 1846
An Act for making Railways from Wisbech to Saint Ives and to Fenny-Drayton, to be called "The Wisbech, Saint Ives, and Cambridge Junction Railway." (Repealed by Great Eastern Railway Act 1862 (25 & 26 Vict. c. ccxxiii))
Enfield and Edmonton Railway Act 1846 (repealed)	9 & 10 Vict. c. ccclvii	7 August 1846
An Act for making a Railway from the Northern and Eastern Counties Railway at Edmonton to the Town of Enfield in the County of Middlesex. (Repealed by Great Eastern Railway Act 1862 (25 & 26 Vict. c. ccxxiii))
Manchester and Lincoln Union Railway and Chesterfield and Gainsborough Canal Act 1846 (repealed)	9 & 10 Vict. c. ccclviii	7 August 1846
An Act for making a Railway from the Midland Railway at Staveley to the Town of Worksop, and for consolidating into One Undertaking the said proposed Railway and the Canal Navigation from Chesterfield to the River of Trent. (Repealed by Manchester, Sheffield and Lincolnshire Railway Act 1849 (12 & 13 Vict. c. lxxxi))
London and Birmingham Railway (New Street Station) Act 1846 or the London and Birmingham Railway (Birmingham Extension) Act 1846	9 & 10 Vict. c. ccclix	7 August 1846
An Act for making a Railway from the London and Birmingham Railway to or near to Navigation Street within the Borough of Birmingham.
Kilkenny and Great Southern and Western Railway Act 1846	9 & 10 Vict. c. ccclx	7 August 1846
An Act for making a Railway from Kilkenny to join the Great Southern and Western Railway at or near Cuddagh, to be called "The Kilkenny and Great Southern and Western Railway."
Dublin Cemeteries Act 1846	9 & 10 Vict. c. ccclxi	7 August 1846
An Act for the Maintenance of the Cemeteries at Golden Bridge and Prospect in the County of Dublin, and to create a perpetual Succession in the governing Body or Committee for managing the same.
Argyll Canal Act 1846	9 & 10 Vict. c. ccclxii	7 August 1846
An Act for making a Canal from the Harbour of East Tarbert to West Loch Tarbert, and other Works in connexion therewith.
Sligo Ship Canal Act 1846	9 & 10 Vict. c. ccclxiii	7 August 1846
An Act for making a Ship Canal from Sligo Harbour to Lough Gill, both in the County of Sligo, to be called "The Sligo Ship Canal."
Campbeltown Harbour and Burgh Act 1846	9 & 10 Vict. c. ccclxiv	7 August 1846
An Act for enlarging, improving, and maintaining the Harbour, Quays, and Wharfs of Campbeltown; for supplying with Water, paving, cleansing, lighting, and watching the said Burgh and Suburbs thereof; and for the better and more effectual assessing, lev3dng, and collecting the Ladle and other Dues and Customs of the said Burgh.
Edinburgh Middle District Roads and Bridges Act 1846 (repealed)	9 & 10 Vict. c. ccclxv	7 August 1846
An Act for further regulating the Repair and Maintenance of the Roads, Streets, and Bridges within the Middle District of the County of Edinburgh, and the Assessments payable in respect thereof; and for other Purposes relating thereto. (Repealed by Edinburgh Roads and Streets Act 1862 (25 & 26 Vict. c. liii))
Yeovil Borough Estate Act 1846 (repealed)	9 & 10 Vict. c. ccclxvi	7 August 1846
An Act to enable the Special Commissioners of the Town of Yeovil to sell certain Estates in the Parish of Yeovil in the County of Somerset. (Repealed by Borough of Yeovil Extension and Improvement Act 1854 (17 & 18 Vict. c. cxxv))
Eastern Counties and Thames Junction Railway Branches Act 1846 (repealed)	9 & 10 Vict. c. ccclxvii	13 August 1846
An Act to enable the Eastern Counties Railway Company to make Two Branch Railways from the line of the Eastern Counties and Thames Junction Railway, one thereof terminating at the Pepper Warehouses belonging to the East India Dock Company, and the other terminating by a Junction with the Eastern Counties Railway. (Repealed by Great Eastern Railway Act 1862 (25 & 26 Vict. c. ccxxiii))
Rugby and Leamington Railway Act 1846	9 & 10 Vict. c. ccclxviii	13 August 1846
An Act for making a Railway from the London and Birmingham Railway in the Parish oi Rugby in the County of Warwick to Leamington in the County of Warwick.
West London Railway and Extension Act 1846	9 & 10 Vict. c. ccclxix	13 August 1846
An Act to authorize an Improvement of the Line of the West London Railway, and the Extension thereof to the River Thames.
London and South-western Railway Company's Basingstoke and Salisbury Extension Act 1846 or the London and South Western Railway (Basingstoke and Salisbury Extension) Act 1846	9 & 10 Vict. c. ccclxx	13 August 1846
An Act to enable the London and South-western Railway Company to make a Railway by Whitchurch and Andover to Salisbury.
Monmouthshire Railway Act 1846	9 & 10 Vict. c. ccclxxi	13 August 1846
An Act for making certain Branch Railways to be connected with the Newport and Pontypool Railway, and for incorporating a new Company for carrying on the Monmouthshire Canal Navigation.
Glasgow, Dumfries, and Carlisle Railway Act 1846 (repealed)	9 & 10 Vict. c. ccclxxii	13 August 1846
An Act for making a Railway from the Glasgow, Paisley, Kilmarnock, and Ayr Railway near Cumnock to the Caledonian Railway near the crossing of the River Sark, to be called "The Glasgow, Dumfries, and Carlisle Railway," with Branches. (Repealed by Glasgow and South Western Railway Consolidation Act 1855 (18 & 19 Vict. c. xcvii))
Andevor Canal Sale Act 1846 or the Andover Canal Sale Act 1846	9 & 10 Vict. c. ccclxxiii	13 August 1846
An Act for authorizing the Sale of the Andevor (Note: Andevor is an old spelling of Andover.) Canal and other Property of the Company of Proprietors of the Andevor Canal Navigation.
Tramore Estuary Reclamation Act 1846	9 & 10 Vict. c. ccclxxiv	13 August 1846
An Act for embanking and reclaiming from the Sea certain Lands now under Water or subject to be overflowed by the Tide in the Estuary or Back Strand of Tramore in the County of Waterford.
British Guarantee Association Act 1846 (repealed)	9 & 10 Vict. c. ccclxxv	13 August 1846
An Act to incorporate the British Guarantee Association. (Repealed by British Guarantee Association Act 1854 (17 & 18 Vict. c. ccxvi))
North Lynn and St. Margaret Parishes Union of Livings Act 1846	9 & 10 Vict. c. ccclxxvi	13 August 1846
An Act for uniting the Rectory of North Lynn with the Perpetual Curacy of Saint Margaret with Saint Nicholas in the Borough of King's Lynn, all in the County of Norfolk.
Airdrie and Bathgate Junction Railway Act 1846	9 & 10 Vict. c. ccclxxvii	13 August 1846
An Act for making a Railway from Airdrie to Bathgate, with a Branch to Whitburn and Blackburn, to be called "The Airdrie and Bathgate Junction Railway."
Manchester and Leeds Railway (Manchester, Bolton and Bury Canal and Railway) Act 1846 or the Manchester, Bolton, and Bury and Manchester and Leeds Canal and Railway Act 1846	9 & 10 Vict. c. ccclxxviii	18 August 1846
An Act to incorporate the Company of Proprietors of the Manchester, Bolton, and Bury Canal Navigation and Railway with the Manchester and Leeds Railway Company.
Caledonian, Polloc and Govan, and Clydesdale Junction Railways Amalgamation Act 1846	9 & 10 Vict. c. ccclxxix	18 August 1846
An Act to amalgamate the Polloc and Govan and Clydesdale Junction Railways with the Caledonian Railway.
Huddersfield and Manchester Railway and Canal (Oldham Branch) Act 1846	9 & 10 Vict. c. ccclxxx	18 August 1846
An Act for enabling the Huddersfield and Manchester Railway and Canal Company to make a Branch Railway from their Main Line of Railway to Oldham.
Liverpool, Ormskirk, and Preston Railway Act 1846	9 & 10 Vict. c. ccclxxxi	18 August 1846
An Act for making a Railway from the Liverpool and Bury Railway to the North Union and Blackburn and Preston Railways, with Branches therefrom, to be called "The Liverpool, Ormskirk, and Preston Railway."
New Zealand Company Act 1846	9 & 10 Vict. c. ccclxxxii	18 August 1846
An Act to grant certain Powers to the New Zealand Company.
Plymouth Great Western Dock Act 1846	9 & 10 Vict. c. ccclxxxiii	18 August 1846
An Act for constructing Docks at Millbay (Plymouth), to be called the Plymouth Great Western Docks.
Forth and Clyde Navigation Act 1846	9 & 10 Vict. c. ccclxxxiv	18 August 1846
An Act to enable the Company of Proprietors of the Forth and Clyde Navigation to extend and enlarge the Basin at Bowling Bay, and to make and maintain certain other Works in connexion therewith; and to alter and amend the Acts relating to the said Navigation.
Brighouse Improvement Act 1846 (repealed)	9 & 10 Vict. c. ccclxxxv	18 August 1846
An Act for sewering, draining, and lighting of the Hamlet of Brighouse in the Township of Hipperholme-cum-Brighouse in the Parish of Halifax in the West Riding of the County of York. (Repealed by West Yorkshire Act 1980 (c. xiv))
Salthouse Sands Reclamation Act 1846	9 & 10 Vict. c. ccclxxxvi	18 August 1846
An Act for reclaiming from the Sea, embanking and improving, the Salthouse Sands in the Manor of Plain Furness in the County Palatine of Lancaster.
Wexford Harbour Improvement Act 1846 (repealed)	9 & 10 Vict. c. ccclxxxvii	18 August 1846
An Act for improving and altering a Portion of the Harbour of Wexford in the County of Wexford in Ireland, and the Entrance thereof; for improving the Navigation of the River Slaney, and also the Bridge over the same River at or near to the Town of Wexford; and for embanking and reclaiming divers Waste Lands, Mud Banks or Slobs, in and adjacent to the said Harbour and River; and for other Purposes. (Repealed by Wexford Harbour Embankment Act 1852 (15 & 16 Vict. c. cli))
Norfolk Estuary Act 1846 (repealed)	9 & 10 Vict. c. ccclxxxviii	18 August 1846
An Act for inclosing and reclaiming from the Sea certain Tracts of Land forming Part of the Great Estuary called "The Wash," between the Counties of Norfolk and Lincoln. (Repealed by Norfolk Estuary Act 1857 (20 & 21 Vict. c. cxlvi))
All Soul's College, Oxford, Leasing Powers Act 1846	9 & 10 Vict. c. ccclxxxix	18 August 1846
An Act for enabling the Warden and College of the Souls of All Faithful People deceased of Oxford to grant Building and Improving Leases of their Estates in the County of Middlesex.
West Riding Union Railways Act 1846	9 & 10 Vict. c. cccxc	18 August 1846
An Act for making certain Lines of Railway in the West Riding of the County of York, to be called "The West Riding Union Railways."
London and South-western Railway Company's London Bridge Extension Act 1846 or the London and South Western Railway (London Bridge Extension) Act 1846	9 & 10 Vict. c. cccxci	26 August 1846
An Act to enable the London and South-western Railway Company to extend their Railway to the Thames near London Bridge in the County of Surrey.
Glasgow and Belfast Union Railway Act 1846	9 & 10 Vict. c. cccxcii	26 August 1846
An Act for making a Railway from the Glasgow, Paisley, Kilmarnock, and Ayr Railway near the Manse of Newton to the Town of Girvan, with a Branch to the Town of Maybole, to be called "The Glasgow and Belfast Union Railway."
Taff Vale Railway Act 1846	9 & 10 Vict. c. cccxciii	26 August 1846
An Act to empower the Taff Vale Railway Company to construct certain Branch Railways and Extensions, and to make Arrangements for the Use of certain Wharfs adjoining the Bute Ship Canal.
Newcastle-upon-Tyne and Carlisle Branch Railway Act 1846	9 & 10 Vict. c. cccxciv	26 August 1846
An Act to authorize the Newcastle-upon-Tyne and Carlisle Railway Company to extend their Railway in Newcastle-upon-Tyne, to make a Branch Railway, and for other Purposes connected with their Undertaking.
Caledonian Railway (Clydesdale Junction Railway Deviations) Act 1846	9 & 10 Vict. c. cccxcv	26 August 1846
An Act to enable the Caledonian Railway Company to deviate certain Portions of the Clydesdale Junction Railway.
East and West India Docks and Birmingham Junction Railway Act 1846	9 & 10 Vict. c. cccxcvi	26 August 1846
An Act for making a Railway from the East and West India Docks to join the London and Birmingham Railway at the Camden Town Station, to be called "The East and West India Docks and Birmingham Junction Railway."
Cork and Waterford Railway Act 1846	9 & 10 Vict. c. cccxcvii	26 August 1846
An Act for making a Railway from Cork to Waterford, with Branches therefrom.
Metropolitan Sewerage Manure Act 1846	9 & 10 Vict. c. cccxcviii	26 August 1846
An Act to incorporate a Company by the Name of "The Metropolitan Sewage Manure Company."
Port of London (Legal Quays) Act 1846 (repealed)	9 & 10 Vict. c. cccxcix	26 August 1846
An Act for the Regulation of the Legal Quays within the Port of London. (Repealed by Statute Law (Repeals) Act 1993 (c. 50))
Dublin Improvement Act 1846	9 & 10 Vict. c. cccc	26 August 1846
An Act to extend the Powers of the Commissioners of Wide Streets, Dublin, to widen and improve certain Streets and Passages in the City and County of Dublin.
Cameron's Coalbrook Steam Coal and Swansea and Loughor Railway Company's Act 1846	9 & 10 Vict. c. cccci	28 August 1846
An Act to authorize the Construction of a Railway from Maln-y-Manach to Rhydydefydd in the County of Glamorgan, to be called "Cameron's Coalbrook Steam Coal and Swansea and Loughor Railway."
South Devon Railway (Amendment and Branches) Act 1846	9 & 10 Vict. c. ccccii	28 August 1846
An Act for authorizing certain Alterations in and Extensions of the Line of the South Devon Railway, and the Formation of Branches therefrom to Torquay and other Places.

=== Private acts ===
Short title	Citation	Royal assent
Long title
Earl of Blesinton's Estate Act 1846	9 & 10 Vict. c. 1 Pr.	18 June 1846
An Act for vesting the Real Estates of the Right Honourable Charles John late Earl of Blesinton deceased, in the County and County of the City of Dublin, the City of Kilhenny, and the County of Tyrone, in Trustees for Sale, for the Payment of his Debts; and for other Purposes.
Sir George Dunbar's Estate Act 1846	9 & 10 Vict. c. 2 Pr.	18 June 1846
An Act for selling such Parts of the entailed Lands and Estates of Hempriggs lying in the County of Caithness, belonging to Sir George Dunbar Baronet, as may be necessary for the Payment of the Debts and Obligations affecting or that may be made to affect the said Lands and Estates.
Marquess of Donegall's Estate Act 1846	9 & 10 Vict. c. 3 Pr.	18 June 1846
An Act to enlarge the Powers of leasing the Estates comprised in an Act passed in the Eighth and Ninth Years of the Reign of Her present Majesty Queen Victoria, intituled "An Act to authorize the Sale of Settled Estates of the Most Honourable the Marquess of Donegall in Ireland, in order to pay off Mortgage and other Incumbrances;" (Note: Marquis of Donegall's Estate Act 1845 (8 & 9 Vict. c. 31 Pr.)) and for other Purposes.
Solly's Estate Act 1846	9 & 10 Vict. c. 4 Pr.	18 June 1846
An Act for vesting certain undivided Shares in Estates devised by the Will of Joseph Solly Esquire, deceased, in Trustees for Sale; and for other Purposes.
Gollon Inclosure Act 1846	9 & 10 Vict. c. 5 Pr.	18 June 1846
An Act for inclosing, dividing, and allotting certain Lands within the Manor or Lordship of Gollon, situate in the several Parishes of Llanbadarn-Fynydd, Llanano, LLanbister, LLandewy-Ystradennyy Abbey Cwmhir, and Saint Harmon, in the County of Radnor.
Askew's Estate Act 1846	9 & 10 Vict. c. 6 Pr.	26 June 1846
An Act for empowering the Tenants for Life under the Wills of Miss Mary Cary and Adam Askew Esquire, deceased, and Trustees during Minorities, to grant Building Leases; and for other Purposes.
Upwell-cum-Welney Rectory Act 1846	9 & 10 Vict. c. 7 Pr.	26 June 1846
An Act for the Division of the Rectory of Upwell-cum-Welney in the County of Norfolk and in the Isle of Ely in the County of Cambridge.
Frilford Inclosure Act 1846	9 & 10 Vict. c. 8 Pr.	3 July 1846
An Act for dividing, allotting, laying in Severalty, inclosing, and draining, the Open and Common Fields, Common Meadows, and other Commonable Lands and Waste Grounds in the Hamlet or Township of Frilford in the Parish of Marcham in the County of Berks.
Vidgen's (or Dudderidge's) Estate Act 1846	9 & 10 Vict. c. 9 Pr.	16 July 1846
An Act for vesting in Trustees certain Hereditaments in the County of Kent devised by the Will of Henry Dudderidge Gentleman, to enable them to carry into execution an Agreement between his Devisees in Trust and Alexander James Beresford Hope Esquire, for the Sale thereof, and for subjecting the Bank Annuities, the Produce of the Purchase Money, to the same Trusts.
Videan's Estate Act 1846	9 & 10 Vict. c. 10 Pr.	16 July 1846
An Act for vesting in Trustees certain Hereditaments in the County of Kent the Estate of Emma Bedford Videan, a Lunatic, to enable them to carry into execution a Treaty between her Husband, Mr. Joseph Videan, and Alexander James Beresford Hope Esquire, for the Sale thereof; also for laying out the Purchase Money in the Purchase of Bank Annuities, to be held as Beal Estate in trust for the said Emma Bedford Videan and her Heirs.
Archbishop of York's Estate Act 1846	9 & 10 Vict. c. 11 Pr.	16 July 1846
An Act for effecting an Exchange of Lands between the Archbishop of York, the Earl of Carlisle, and Viscount Morpeth.
Wauchope's Estate Act 1846	9 & 10 Vict. c. 12 Pr.	16 July 1846
An Act to enable Andrew Wauchope Esquire, of Niddrie Marischall, to uplift certain Sums of Money lying in Bank, and to be consigned therein, and to borrow upon the Security of his entailed Estates such further Sums as may be necessary for Repayment to him of a Portion of the Monies laid out and to be laid out in the Improvement of the said Estates.
Dundas' Estate Act 1846	9 & 10 Vict. c. 13 Pr.	16 July 1846
An Act to vest in Trustees in Fee Simple the entailed Lands of Haltree and others, for the Purpose of selling the same, and applying the Price in Payment of Debts which affect or may be made to affect the same; and for other Purposes connected therewith.
Cullen's Estate Act 1846	9 & 10 Vict. c. 14 Pr.	16 July 1846
An Act to enable the Trustees of the settled Estate of William Cullen to sell to Alexander James Beresford Hope Esquire, before the appointed Time under the Settlement, a Portion of that Estate for which an Offer has been made them by him.
De Winton's Estate Act 1846	9 & 10 Vict. c. 15 Pr.	16 July 1846
An Act for authorizing Leases to be granted for Mining and other Purposes of Estates in the County of Glamorgan belonging to Walter De Winton Esquire (an Infant), Tenant in Tail under the Will of Walter Wilkins Esquire, deceased; and for other Purposes.
Thompson's Charity Estate Act 1846	9 & 10 Vict. c. 16 Pr.	16 July 1846
An Act to enable the Trustees or Guardians appointed by Joseph Thomson of Nortonhall of Eildon, deceased, to sell the said Lands of Nortonhall of Eildon, and also the Half of a Storey of a House in Saint Marias Wynd, Edinburgh, and relative Policy of Insurance, vested in them in trust, and apply the Price to be obtained, and certain Trust Monies in their Hands, in the Purchase of other Lands, for the Purposes of the said Trust.
Hill's Estate Act 1846	9 & 10 Vict. c. 17 Pr.	27 July 1846
An Act to alter and amend an Act passed in the Third and Fourth Years of the Reign of Her present Majesty, intituled "An Act to enable the Trustees of the Marriage Articles of Thomas Bacon Esquire to grant a new Lease to Richard Hill and Anthony Hill Esquires of an Iron Furnace, and Works and Mines, and Privileges and Hereditaments held therewith, called Plymouth Works, in the Parish of Merthyr Tydvill in the County of Glamorgan;" (Note: Thomas Bacon's Marriage Settlement Act 1840 (3 & 4 Vict. c. 18 Pr.)) and for better carrying the same Act into effect.
Ludlow Charity Estate Act 1846	9 & 10 Vict. c. 18 Pr.	27 July 1846
An Act for carrying into effect on Agreement respecting the Estates of the Corporation of the Borough of Ludlow, and other Estates vested in the said Corporation, in trust, either partly or in whole, for certain charitable Uses; and for appropriating certain Estates to the Charity herein-after mentioned, and declaring the Trusts thereof; and for making Provision for Payment of the Debts of the said Corporation; and other Purposes.
Howell's Charity Estate Act 1846	9 & 10 Vict. c. 19 Pr.	27 July 1846
An Act to authorize the Sale of Part of the Charity Estates vested in the Master, Wardens, and Brethren and Sisters of the Guild or Fraternity of the Blessed Mary the Virgin of the Mystery of Drapers of the City of London, upon the Trusts of the Will of Thomas Howell deceased.
Ramsey's Estate Act 1846	9 & 10 Vict. c. 20 Pr.	27 July 1846
An Act to enable William Ramsay Ramsay of Barnton, Heir of Entail in possession of Barnton and other Estates in the County of Edinburgh, to borrow Money upon the Security of the said Estates for the Repayment of Monies laid out in the Improvement of the said Estate, and to enable him and his Successors to grant Feus of certain Parts thereof; and for other Purposes therein expressed.
Barrs's Estate Act 1846	9 & 10 Vict. c. 21 Pr.	3 August 1846
An Act for vesting Estates in the Parish of West Bromwich in the County of Stafford, devised by the Will of Joseph Barrs, deceased, and the Mines and Minerals under the same, in Trustees for Sale, with Powers to grant Leases of such Estates, and to grant, demise, or sell the Coal, Ironstone, and other Minerals in or under the same.
Fleeming's Estate Act 1846	9 & 10 Vict. c. 22 Pr.	3 August 1846
An Act for burdening or selling a Portion of the entailed Estate of Cumbernauld in the County of Dumbarton, for Payment of Debt.
Park's (or Yates's) Estate Act 1846	9 & 10 Vict. c. 23 Pr.	3 August 1846
An Act to enable the Trustees of the Will of Edmund Yates Esquire, deceased, to sell the Estates in the County of Kent devised by the same Will, and to invest the Monies to arise from such Sale in the Public Funds.
Philip's Estate Act 1846	9 & 10 Vict. c. 24 Pr.	3 August 1846
An Act to incorporate the Governors and Managers appointed under the Trust Disposition and Settlement of Robert Philip of Edenshead deceased, and to explain and extend the Powers and Provisions contained in the said Deed.
Spalding's Estate Act 1846	9 & 10 Vict. c. 25 Pr.	3 August 1846
An Act to enable John Eden Spalding, with the Consent of a Trustee, to lease the Mines and Minerals within the Lands of Holm and other Lands and Estates in the Stewartry of Kircudbright in Scotland.
Lord Kinnaird's (Sir John Webb's) Estate Act 1846	9 & 10 Vict. c. 26 Pr.	7 August 1846
An Act to enable the Trustees acting under the Will of the late Sir John Webb Baronet, deceased, to concur with other Parties, under the Sanction of the High Court of Chancery, in the Sale and Conveyance of certain Estates in the County of Dorset and in the Town and County of the Town of Poole devised by the said Testator, and of Estates subsequently acquired by the Trustees of his said Will, and subject to the Trusts of the said Will.
Borthwick's Estate Act 1846	9 & 10 Vict. c. 27 Pr.	13 August 1846
An Act to vest in Trustees in Fee Simple the entailed Estate of Overshiels in the County of Edinburgh, for the Purpose of selling the same, and purchasing other Lands to be entailed in lieu thereof.
Lowestoft Charity Estate Act 1846	9 & 10 Vict. c. 28 Pr.	13 August 1846
An Act to enable the Trustees of certain Charity and Trust Estates at and near the Town of Lowestoft in the County of Suffolk to carry into effect a Contract for the Sale of Parts thereof to the Lowestoft Railway and Harbour Company; and to enable the said Trustees, and the Trustees of other Charity and Trust Estates at and near the said Town of Lowestoft, to grant Leases for long Terms of Years for Building Purposes of the said Estates or Parts thereof; and for other Purposes.
Pemberton's (or Gervis's) Estate Act 1846	9 & 10 Vict. c. 29 Pr.	13 August 1846
An Act to extend the Powers of Sale and Exchange and the Power to grant Building Leases respectively contained in the Will of Sir George William Tapps Gervis deceased; and to empower the Trustees of the said Will to raise Money by Mortgage for the Improvement of Part of the Estates devised by the said Will; and to confirm a Contract for an Exchange entered into by the said Trustees with the Right Honourable James Howard Harris Earl of Malmesbury.
Duke of Cleveland's (Hardwick Hart, &c.) Estate Act 1846	9 & 10 Vict. c. 30 Pr.	18 August 1846
An Act to give further Powers to the Trustees of the Will of the late Duke of Cleveland for the Management of the Trust Estates in the County of Durham by the said Will devised.
Scott's Estate Act 1846	9 & 10 Vict. c. 31 Pr.	18 August 1846
An Act to vest the Estates in Ireland settled by the Will of Bindon Scott deceased in Trustees, for the Purposes therein set forth.
Booth's Charities (Clowes') Estate Act 1846	9 & 10 Vict. c. 32 Pr.	18 August 1846
An Act to unite and to incorporate the Trustees of certain Charities established by Humphrey Booth the elder, Esquire, and by Humphrey Booth Esquire, his Grandson, respectively; and to amend an Act of Parliament made and passed in the Sixteenth Year of His late Majesty King George the Third, intituled "An Act to enable the Trustees of certain Charity Lands belonging to the Poor of Salford in the County Palatine of Lancaster to grant Building Leases thereof;" (Note: Booth's Charity, Salford Act 1776 (16 Geo. 3. c. 55)) and to make further Provision for the beneficial Management and Administration of the several Charity Estates and Charities of the said Humphrey Booth the elder and Humphrey Booth, his Grandson, respectively.
Horne's (Ferguson's) Estate Act 1846	9 & 10 Vict. c. 33 Pr.	18 August 1846
An Act to enable the Trustees appointed by Mrs. Jane Ferguson deceased to sell the Lands of Laverocklaw, and also certain Subjects situate in the Village of Ormiston, vested in them in trust, and to apply the Price to be obtained, and certain Trust Monies in their Hands, in the Purchase of other Lands, for the Purposes of the said Trust.
Sion College Estate Act 1846 (repealed)	9 & 10 Vict. c. 34 Pr.	26 August 1846
An Act for enabling the President and Fellows of Sion College within the City of London to raise Money by way of Annuity on Part of their Estates. (Repealed by Sion College Act 1956 (4 & 5 Eliz. 2. c. li))
All Hallowes (Northampton) Tithes Act 1846 (repealed)	9 & 10 Vict. c. 35 Pr.	26 August 1846
An Act for facilitating the raising of the annual Sum of One hundred Pounds settled upon the Vicar for the Time being of the Parish of All Hallowes in the Town of Northampton in lieu of Tithes, by an Act passed in the Twenty-ninth Year of the Reign of King Charles the Second. (Note: All Hallowes, Northampton Act 1677 (29 Cha. 2. c. 8 Pr.)) (Repealed by Northampton Act 1988 (c. xxix))
Duke of Cleveland's (Bathwick and Wrighton) Estate Act 1846	9 & 10 Vict. c. 36 Pr.	26 August 1846
An Act to enable the Trustees of the Will of the Most Noble William Harry late Duke of Cleveland to grant Leases and make Sale of the Bathwick and Wrington Estates in the County of Somerset.
Duke of Norfolk's Estate Act 1846	9 & 10 Vict. c. 37 Pr.	26 August 1846
An Act to enable the Most Noble Henry Charles Duke of Norfolk, and other the Owner for the Time being of Arundel Castle and the Estates settled therewith, to grant Leases of Parts thereof; and for other the Purposes therein mentioned.
Lord Kenyon's (Congreve's) Estate Act 1846	9 & 10 Vict. c. 38 Pr.	26 August 1846
An Act for authorizing the Sale of Part of the Estates settled by the Will of William Congreve Esquire, deceased, and for laying out the Surplus of the Monies produced by such Sale, after Payment of his Debts, in the Purchase of other Estates.
Jesus Hospital (Newcastle) Estate Act 1846 (repealed)	9 & 10 Vict. c. 39 Pr.	26 August 1846
An Act for the better Support and better Regulation of "The Hospital of the Holy Jesus, founded in the Manors in the Town and County of Newcastle-upon-Tyne at the Costs and Charges of the Mayor and Burgesses of the Town of Newcastle-upon-Tyne in the County of the Town of Newcastle-upon-Tyne aforesaid," and for confirming Sales and other Dispositions made of Estates formerly Part of the Possessions of the said Hospital; and for other Purposes. (Repealed by Holy Jesus Hospital, Newcastle-upon-Tyne Act 1847 (10 & 11 Vict. c. 34 Pr.))
Bond's Estate Act 1846	9 & 10 Vict. c. 40 Pr.	26 August 1846
An Act to vest certain Lands and Hereditaments, the Estates of Alexander Perry Bond Esquire, situate in the County of Westmeath in Ireland, in Trustees, to raise Money for the Payment of Incumbrances affecting said Lands and Hereditaments, and, subject thereto, to limit the said Lands and Hereditaments for the Uses and Purposes declared by the Will of William Bond Esquire, deceased.
Sir Richard Philips's Estate Act 1846	9 & 10 Vict. c. 41 Pr.	26 August 1846
An Act to enable Sir Richard Bulkeley Philipps Philipps Baronet and others to grant Mining, Building, and other Leases of certain Estates in the County of Pembroke, subject to the Uses of the Will of Richard Baron Milford deceased.
Virgin Mary's Hospital (Newcastle-upon-Tyne) Estate Act 1846	9 & 10 Vict. c. 42 Pr.	26 August 1846
An Act for enabling the Master and Brethren of the Hospital of Saint Mary the Virgin within the Borough of Newcastle-upon-Tyne to grant Building, Repairing, Mining, and other Leases of their Estates, and for extending the Objects of the Charity, and regulating the Appropriation of the Income thereof.
Macfarlane's (Glasgow College) Estate Act 1846	9 & 10 Vict. c. 43 Pr.	26 August 1846
An Act to enable the College of Glasgow to effect an Exchange of the present Lands and Buildings belonging to and occupied by the said College for other sufficient and adequate Lands and Buildings more advantageously situated; and for other Purposes relating thereto.
Ferguson's Naturalization Act 1846 (Note: This act was not printed by the Queen's Printer.)	9 & 10 Vict. c. 44 Pr.	30 March 1846
An Act to repeal so much of an Act passed in Ferguson's the fourth year of the reign of his late Majesty King George the Fourth, intituled, "An Act for naturalizing Henry Robert Ferguson," (Note: Naturalization of Henry Ferguson Act 1823 (4 Geo. 4. c. 39 Pr.)) as enacts that the said Henry Robert Ferguson should not thereby be enabled to be of the Privy Council, or a Member of either House of Parliament, or to take any Office or Place of Trust either Civil or Military, or to have any Grant of Lands, Tenements or Hereditaments from the Crown to Himself, or any other Person or Persons in Trust for him.
Creagh's Divorce Act 1846	9 & 10 Vict. c. 45 Pr.	16 July 1846
An Act to dissolve the Marriage of Jasper Byng Creagh, Esquire, with Emma Susan Weldale Creagh, his present Wife, and to enable him to marry again, and for other Purposes therein mentioned.
Curtis's Divorce Act 1846	9 & 10 Vict. c. 46 Pr.	16 July 1846
An Act to dissolve the Marriage of George Savage Curtis, Esquire, with Emma Curtis, his now Wife, and for other Purposes.
Edward Clark's Divorce Act 1846	9 & 10 Vict. c. 47 Pr.	13 August 1846
An Act to dissolve the Marriage of Edward Clark, with his now Wife, and to enable him to marry again, and for other Purposes.
Matthyssens's Divorce Act 1846	9 & 10 Vict. c. 48 Pr.	13 August 1846
An Act to dissolve the Marriage of Edward Matthyssens with Joanna Frances, his now Wife, and to enable him to marry again, and for other Purposes.
Bishop of Jerusalem's Naturalization Act 1846	9 & 10 Vict. c. 49 Pr.	13 August 1846
An Act for naturalizing the Reverend Samuel Gobat, Clerk, Bishop of the United Church of England and Ireland in Jerusalem.
Farquharson's Divorce Act 1846	9 & 10 Vict. c. 50 Pr.	26 August 1846
An Act to dissolve the Marriage of Robert Nesham Farquharson, Esquire, with Mary Ann, his now Wife, and to enable him to marry again, and for other Purposes.
Humphreys's Divorce Act 1846	9 & 10 Vict. c. 51 Pr.	26 August 1846
An Act to dissolve the Marriage of the Reverend Salusbury Humphreys, Clerk, with Harriet Ruthan Humphreys, his now Wife, and to enable him to marry again, and for other Purposes.

=== Sources ===
- The Statutes of the United Kingdom of Great Britain and Ireland, 9 & 10 Victoria. 1846. London: Eyre and Spottiswoode. 1846 – via Internet Archive.
- The Statutes of the United Kingdom of Great Britain and Ireland, 9 & 10 Victoria. 1846. London: Eyre and Spottiswoode. 1846 – via Google Books.
- Journals of the House of Commons (PDF). Vol. 101 – via parliament.uk.

== See also ==
- List of acts of the Parliament of the United Kingdom
