= List of acts of the Parliament of the United Kingdom from 1855 =

This is a complete list of acts of the Parliament of the United Kingdom for the year 1855.

Note that the first parliament of the United Kingdom was held in 1801; parliaments between 1707 and 1800 were either parliaments of Great Britain or of Ireland). For acts passed up until 1707, see the list of acts of the Parliament of England and the list of acts of the Parliament of Scotland. For acts passed from 1707 to 1800, see the list of acts of the Parliament of Great Britain. See also the list of acts of the Parliament of Ireland.

For acts of the devolved parliaments and assemblies in the United Kingdom, see the list of acts of the Scottish Parliament, the list of acts of the Northern Ireland Assembly, and the list of acts and measures of Senedd Cymru; see also the list of acts of the Parliament of Northern Ireland.

The number shown after each act's title is its chapter number. Acts passed before 1963 are cited using this number, preceded by the year(s) of the reign during which the relevant parliamentary session was held; thus the Union with Ireland Act 1800 is cited as "39 & 40 Geo. 3 c. 67", meaning the 67th act passed during the session that started in the 39th year of the reign of George III and which finished in the 40th year of that reign. Note that the modern convention is to use Arabic numerals in citations (thus "41 Geo. 3" rather than "41 Geo. III"). Acts of the last session of the Parliament of Great Britain and the first session of the Parliament of the United Kingdom are both cited as "41 Geo. 3".

Some of these acts have a short title. Some of these acts have never had a short title. Some of these acts have a short title given to them by later acts, such as by the Short Titles Act 1896.

== 18 & 19 Vict. ==
The third session of the 16th Parliament of the United Kingdom, which met from 12 December 1854 until 14 August 1855.

=== Public general acts ===
Short title	Citation	Royal assent
Long title
Militia (No. 1) Act 1855 (repealed)	18 & 19 Vict. c. 1	23 December 1854
An Act to enable Her Majesty to accept the Services of the Militia out of the United Kingdom for the vigorous Prosecution of the War. (Repealed by Militia (Voluntary Enlistment) Act 1875 (38 & 39 Vict. c. 69))
Enlistment of Foreigners Act 1855 (repealed)	18 & 19 Vict. c. 2	23 December 1854
An Act to permit Foreigners to be enlisted and to serve as Officers and Soldiers in Her Majesty's Forces. (Repealed by Statute Law Revision Act 1875 (38 & 39 Vict. c. 66))
Fishery Treaty with United States Act 1855 (repealed)	18 & 19 Vict. c. 3	19 February 1855
An Act to carry into effect a Treaty between Her Majesty and the United States of America. (Repealed by Statute Law Revision Act 1875 (38 & 39 Vict. c. 66))
Army Enlistment Act 1855 (repealed)	18 & 19 Vict. c. 4	27 February 1855
An Act to amend the Act (Note: Time of Service in the Army Act 1847 (10 & 11 Vict. c. 37)) for limiting the Time of Service in the Army. (Repealed by Statute Law Revision Act 1875 (38 & 39 Vict. c. 66))
Supply Act 1855 (repealed)	18 & 19 Vict. c. 5	5 March 1855
An Act to apply the Sum of Three millions three hundred thousand Pounds out of the Consolidated Fund to the Service of the Year ending the Thirty-first Day of March One thousand eight hundred and fifty-five. (Repealed by Statute Law Revision Act 1875 (38 & 39 Vict. c. 66))
Supply (No. 2) Act 1855 (repealed)	18 & 19 Vict. c. 6	5 March 1855
An Act to apply the Sum of Twenty Millions out of the Consolidated Fund to the Service of the Year One thousand eight hundred and fifty-five. (Repealed by Statute Law Revision Act 1875 (38 & 39 Vict. c. 66))
Common Law Procedure (Ireland) Act 1855 (repealed)	18 & 19 Vict. c. 7	16 March 1855
An Act to extend to Ireland the Provisions of the Eighteenth Section of the Common Law Procedure Act, 1854. (Note: Common Law Procedure Act 1854 (17 & 18 Vict. c. 125)) (Repealed by Common Law Procedure Amendment Act (Ireland) 1856 (19 & 20 Vict. c. 102))
Exchequer Bills Act 1855 (repealed)	18 & 19 Vict. c. 8	16 March 1855
An Act for raising the Sum of Seventeen millions one hundred and eighty-three thousand Pounds by Exchequer Bills for the Service of the Year One thousand eight hundred and fifty-five. (Repealed by Statute Law Revision Act 1875 (38 & 39 Vict. c. 66))
Tea Duties Decline Suspension Act 1855 or the Tea Duties Act 1855 (repealed)	18 & 19 Vict. c. 9	16 March 1855
An Act to suspend the Decline of the Customs Duties on Tea from and after the Fifth Day of April One thousand eight hundred and fifty-five. (Repealed by Customs Tariff Act 1855 (18 & 19 Vict. c. 97))
House of Commons Act 1855 (repealed)	18 & 19 Vict. c. 10	16 March 1855
An Act to enable a Third Principal Secretary and a Third Under Secretary of State to sit in the House of Commons. (Repealed by Statute Law Revision Act 1875 (38 & 39 Vict. c. 66))
Mutiny Act 1855 (repealed)	18 & 19 Vict. c. 11	16 March 1855
An Act for punishing Mutiny and Desertion, and for the better Payment of the Army and their Quarters. (Repealed by Statute Law Revision Act 1875 (38 & 39 Vict. c. 66))
Marine Mutiny Act 1855 (repealed)	18 & 19 Vict. c. 12	16 March 1855
An Act for the Regulation of Her Majesty's Royal Marine Forces while on shore. (Repealed by Statute Law Revision Act 1875 (38 & 39 Vict. c. 66))
Lunacy Act 1855 (repealed)	18 & 19 Vict. c. 13	26 April 1855
An Act to explain and amend the Lunacy Regulation Act, 1853. (Note: Lunacy Regulation Act 1853 (16 & 17 Vict. c. 70)) (Repealed by Lunacy Act 1890 (53 & 54 Vict. c. 5))
Annual Inclosure Act 1855 or the Inclosures Act 1855	18 & 19 Vict. c. 14	26 April 1855
An Act to authorise the Inclosure of certain Lands in pursuance of a Report of the Inclosure Commissioners for England and Wales.
Judgments Act 1855 (repealed)	18 & 19 Vict. c. 15	26 April 1855
An Act for the better Protection of Purchasers against Judgments, Crown Debts, Cases of Lis pendens, and Life Annuities or Rentcharges. (Repealed by Courts Act 1971 (c. 23))
Crown Lands Act 1855 (repealed)	18 & 19 Vict. c. 16	26 April 1855
An Act to authorize the letting Parts of the Royal Forests of Dean and Woolmer, and certain other Parts of the Hereditary Possessions of the Crown. (Repealed by Crown Estate Act 1961 (9 & 10 Eliz. 2. c. 55))
Sardinia Loan Act 1855 (repealed)	18 & 19 Vict. c. 17	26 April 1855
An Act to carry into effect a Convention between Her Majesty and the King of Sardinia. (Repealed by Statute Law Revision Act 1950 (14 Geo. 6. c. 6))
National Debt Act 1855 (repealed)	18 & 19 Vict. c. 18	5 May 1855
An Act for raising the Sum of Sixteen Millions by way of Annuities. (Repealed by Statute Law Revision Act 1870 (33 & 34 Vict. c. 69))
Militia (Ireland) Act 1855 (repealed)	18 & 19 Vict. c. 19	25 May 1855
An Act to remove Doubts as to the Commissions of Officers of Militia in Ireland who have omitted to deliver unto the Clerk of the Peace Descriptions of their Qualifications, and to indemnify them against the Consequences of such Omission, and to amend the Law relating to the Militia in Ireland. (Repealed by Militia (Voluntary Enlistment) Act 1875 (38 & 39 Vict. c. 69))
Income Tax Act 1855 (repealed)	18 & 19 Vict. c. 20	25 May 1855
An Act for granting to Her Majesty an increased Rate of Duty on Profits arising from Property, Professions, Trades, and Offices. (Repealed by Statute Law Revision Act 1875 (38 & 39 Vict. c. 66))
Customs Duties Act 1855 or the Customs Act 1855 (repealed)	18 & 19 Vict. c. 21	25 May 1855
An Act for granting certain Duties of Customs on Tea, Coffee, Sugar, and other Articles. (Repealed by Customs Tariff Act 1855 (18 & 19 Vict. c. 97))
Excise Duties Act 1855 (repealed)	18 & 19 Vict. c. 22	25 May 1855
An Act for granting certain additional Rates and Duties of Excise. (Repealed by Statute Law Revision Act 1875 (38 & 39 Vict. c. 66))
Intestate Moveable Succession (Scotland) Act 1855 (repealed)	18 & 19 Vict. c. 23	25 May 1855
An Act to alter in certain respects the Law of Intestate Moveable Succession in Scotland. (Repealed by Succession (Scotland) Act 1964 (c. 41))
Parliamentary Elections (Scotland) Act 1855 (repealed)	18 & 19 Vict. c. 24	25 May 1855
An Act to amend an Act of the Second and Third Years of King William the Fourth, (Note: Representation of the People (Scotland) Act 1832 (2 & 3 Will. 4. c. 65)) for amending the Representation of the People in Scotland, in so far as relates to the Procedure in County Elections in that Country. (Repealed by Ballot Act 1872 (35 & 36 Vict. c. 33))
Affirmations (Scotland) Act 1855 (repealed)	18 & 19 Vict. c. 25	25 May 1855
An Act to allow Affirmations or Declarations to be made instead of Oaths in certain Cases in Scotland. (Repealed by Affirmations (Scotland) Act 1865 (28 & 29 Vict. c. 9))
Forms of Pleading in High Court Act 1855 (repealed)	18 & 19 Vict. c. 26	25 May 1855
An Act to continue an Act of the Thirteenth and Fourteenth Years of Her present Majesty, (Note: Supreme Court (England) Act 1850 (13 & 14 Vict. c. 16)) for enabling the Judges of the Courts of Common Law at Westminster to alter the Forms of Pleading. (Repealed by Statute Law Revision Act 1875 (38 & 39 Vict. c. 66))
Newspapers Act 1855 (repealed)	18 & 19 Vict. c. 27	15 June 1855
An Act to amend the Laws relating to the Stamp Duties on Newspapers, and to provide for the Transmission by Post of printed periodical Publications. (Repealed for the United Kingdom by Inland Revenue Repeal Act 1870 (33 & 34 Vict. c. 99) and for the Isle of Man by Statute Law Revision (Isle of Man) Act 1991 (c. 61))
Ecclesiastical Property (Ireland) Act 1855 (repealed)	18 & 19 Vict. c. 28	15 June 1855
An Act to provide that the Property or Income Tax payable in respect of the Income from Ecclesiastical Property in Ireland shall be a Deduction in estimating the Value of such Property for the Purpose of Taxation by the Ecclesiastical Commissioners. (Repealed by Statute Law Revision Act 1875 (38 & 39 Vict. c. 66))
Registration of Births, Deaths, and Marriages (Scotland) Act 1855 or the Registration (Scotland) Act 1855 (repealed)	18 & 19 Vict. c. 29	15 June 1855
An Act to make further Provision for the Registration of Births, Deaths, and Marriages in Scotland. (Repealed by Registration of Births, Deaths and Marriages (Scotland) Act 1965 (c. 49))
Metropolitan Sewers Act 1855 (repealed)	18 & 19 Vict. c. 30	15 June 1855
An Act to empower the Commissioners of Sewers to expend on House Drainage a certain Sum out of the Monies borrowed by them on Security of the Rates, and also to give to the said Commissioners certain other Powers for the same Purpose. (Repealed by Statute Law Revision Act 1875 (38 & 39 Vict. c. 66))
Incorporation of Brighton Act 1855 (repealed)	18 & 19 Vict. c. 31	15 June 1855
An Act to confirm the Incorporation of the Borough of Brighton. (Repealed by Brighton Corporation Act 1931 (21 & 22 Geo. 5. c. cix))
Stannaries Act 1855	18 & 19 Vict. c. 32	15 June 1855
An Act to amend and extend the Jurisdiction of the Stannary Court.
Validity of Proceedings in the House of Commons Act 1855 (repealed)	18 & 19 Vict. c. 33	15 June 1855
An Act to prevent Doubts as to the Validity of certain Proceedings in the House of Commons. (Repealed by Statute Law Revision Act 1875 (38 & 39 Vict. c. 66))
Education of Pauper Children Act 1855 (repealed)	18 & 19 Vict. c. 34	26 June 1855
An Act to provide for the Education of Children in the Receipt of Out-door Relief. (Repealed by Elementary Education Act 1873 (36 & 37 Vict. c. 86))
Income Tax (Insurance) Act 1855 (repealed)	18 & 19 Vict. c. 35	26 June 1855
An Act to continue the Act (Note: Income Tax (Insurance) Act 1853 (16 & 17 Vict. c. 91)) for extending for a limited Time the Provision for Abatement of Income Tax in respect of Insurance on Lives. (Repealed by Income Tax Act 1918 (8 & 9 Geo. 5. c. 40))
Oxford University Act 1855 (repealed)	18 & 19 Vict. c. 36	26 June 1855
An Act to repeal the Stamp Duties payable on Matriculation and Degrees in the University of Oxford. (Repealed by Statute Law Revision Act 1963 (c. 30))
Supply (No. 3) Act 1855 (repealed)	18 & 19 Vict. c. 37	26 June 1855
An Act to apply the Sum of Ten Millions out of the Consolidated Fund to the Service of the Year One thousand eight hundred and fifty-five. (Repealed by Statute Law Revision Act 1875 (38 & 39 Vict. c. 66))
Spirit of Wine Act 1855 (repealed)	18 & 19 Vict. c. 38	26 June 1855
An Act to allow Spirit of Wine to be used Duty-free in the Arts and Manufactures of the United Kingdom. (Repealed by Revenue Act 1889 (52 & 53 Vict. c. 42))
Leasing Powers Act for Religious Worship in (Ireland) 1855 or the Leasing Powers for Religious Worship in Ireland Act 1855	18 & 19 Vict. c. 39	26 June 1855
An Act to facilitate Grants of Lands and Tenements for the Purpose of Religious Worship and other Purposes connected therewith.
Public Libraries (Ireland) Act 1855 or the Public Libraries Act (Ireland) 1855 (repealed)	18 & 19 Vict. c. 40	26 June 1855
An Act for further promoting the Establishment of Free Public Libraries and Museums in Ireland. (Repealed by Museums (Northern Ireland) Order 1981 (SI 1981/438))
Ecclesiastical Courts Act 1855 (repealed)	18 & 19 Vict. c. 41	26 June 1855
An Act for abolishing the Jurisdiction of the Ecclesiastical Courts of England and Wales in Suits for Defamation. (Repealed by Ecclesiastical Jurisdiction Measure 1963 (No. 1))
Commissioners for Oaths Act 1855 (repealed)	18 & 19 Vict. c. 42	2 July 1855
An Act to enable British Diplomatic and Consular Agents abroad to administer Oaths and do Notarial Acts. (Repealed by Commissioners for Oaths Act 1889 (52 & 53 Vict. c. 10))
Infant Settlements Act 1855 (repealed)	18 & 19 Vict. c. 43	2 July 1855
An Act to enable Infants, with the Approbation of the Court of Chancery, to make binding Settlements of their Real and Personal Estate on Marriage. (Repealed for England and Wales and Scotland by Family Law Reform Act 1969 (c. 46) and for Northern Ireland by Age of Majority Act (Northern Ireland) 1969 (c. 28 (N.I.)))
National Gallery of Ireland Act 1855	18 & 19 Vict. c. 44	2 July 1855
An Act to amend an Act of last Session, (Note: National Gallery of Ireland Act 1854 (17 & 18 Vict. c. 99)) to provide for the Establishment of a National Gallery of Paintings, Sculpture, and the Fine Arts, for the Care of a Public Library, and the Erection of a Public Museum, in Dublin.
Commissions of Assize in County Palatine of Lancaster Act 1855 (repealed)	18 & 19 Vict. c. 45	16 July 1855
An Act for further assimilating the Practice in the County Palatine of Lancaster to that of other Counties with respect to the Trial of Issues from the Superior Courts at Westminster. (Repealed by Statute Law Revision and Civil Procedure Act 1881 (44 & 45 Vict. c. 59))
Woolmer Forest Act 1855 (repealed)	18 & 19 Vict. c. 46	16 July 1855
An Act for disafforesting the forest of Woolmer. (Repealed by Crown Estate Act 1961 (9 & 10 Eliz. 2. c. 55) and Wild Creatures and Forest Laws Act 1971 (c. 47))
Poor Law Union Charges Act 1855 (repealed)	18 & 19 Vict. c. 47	16 July 1855
An Act to continue an Act of the Eighteenth Year of Her present Majesty, (Note: Poor Law Union Charges Act 1854 (17 & 18 Vict. c. 43)) for charging the Maintenance of certain poor Persons in Unions in England and Wales upon the Common Fund. (Repealed by Statute Law Revision Act 1875 (38 & 39 Vict. c. 66))
Cinque Ports Act 1855	18 & 19 Vict. c. 48	16 July 1855
An Act for the better Administration of Justice in the Cinque Ports.
Indemnity Act 1855 (repealed)	18 & 19 Vict. c. 49	16 July 1855
An Act to indemnify such Persons in the United Kingdom as have omitted to qualify themselves for Offices and Employments, and to extend the Time limited for those Purposes respectively. (Repealed by Promissory Oaths Act 1871 (34 & 35 Vict. c. 48))
Court of Exchequer (Ireland) Act 1855 (repealed)	18 & 19 Vict. c. 50	16 July 1855
An Act to amend the Provisions of the Court of Exchequer (Ireland) Act, 1850. (Note: Exchequer Equitable Jurisdiction (Ireland) Act 1850 (13 & 14 Vict. c. 51)) (Repealed by Statute Law Revision Act 1892 (55 & 56 Vict. c. 19))
Poor Rates Act 1855 (repealed)	18 & 19 Vict. c. 51	16 July 1855
An Act to continue the Exemption of Inhabitants from Liability to be rated as such in respect of Stock in Trade or other Property to the Relief of the Poor. (Repealed by Statute Law Revision Act 1875 (38 & 39 Vict. c. 66))
Copyhold, etc., Commission Act 1855 (repealed)	18 & 19 Vict. c. 52	16 July 1855
An Act to continue Appointments under the Act (Note: Inclosure Commissioners Act 1851 (14 & 15 Vict. c. 53)) for consolidating the Copyhold and Inclosure Commissions, and for completing Proceedings under the Tithe Commutation Acts. (Repealed by Statute Law Revision Act 1875 (38 & 39 Vict. c. 66))
Haileybury College Act 1855 (repealed)	18 & 19 Vict. c. 53	16 July 1855
An Act to relieve the East India Company from the Obligation to maintain the College at Haileybury. (Repealed by Statute Law Revision Act 1878 (41 & 42 Vict. c. 79))
New South Wales Constitution Act 1855 known in Australia as the Constitution Statute 1855	18 & 19 Vict. c. 54	16 July 1855
An Act to enable Her Majesty to assent to a Bill, (Note: 17 Vic. No. 41 (NSW)) as amended, of the Legislature of New South Wales, "to confer a Constitution on New South Wales, and to grant a Civil List to Her Majesty."
Victoria Constitution Act 1855	18 & 19 Vict. c. 55	16 July 1855
An Act to enable Her Majesty to assent to a Bill, as amended, of the Legislature of Victoria, to establish a Constitution in and for the Colony of Victoria.
Australian Waste Lands Act 1855	18 & 19 Vict. c. 56	16 July 1855
An Act to repeal the Acts of Parliament now in force respecting the Disposal of the Waste Lands of the Crown in Her Majesty's Australian Colonies, and to make other Provision in lieu thereof.
Militia Act 1855 (repealed)	18 & 19 Vict. c. 57	16 July 1855
An Act further to amend the Laws relating to the Militia in England. (Repealed by Territorial Army and Militia Act 1921 (11 & 12 Geo. 5. c. 37))
Duchy of Lancaster Lands Act 1855	18 & 19 Vict. c. 58	16 July 1855
An Act to better enable the Chancellor and Council of the Duchy of Lancaster to sell and purchase Land on behalf of Her Majesty, Her Heirs and Successors, in right of the said Duchy of Lancaster.
Endowed Schools Inquiries (Ireland) Act 1855 (repealed)	18 & 19 Vict. c. 59	23 July 1855
An Act to facilitate Inquiries of Commissioners of Endowed Schools in Ireland. (Repealed by Statute Law Revision Act 1875 (38 & 39 Vict. c. 66))
Wedding Rings Act 1855 (repealed)	18 & 19 Vict. c. 60	23 July 1855
An Act for excepting Gold Wedding Rings from the Operation of the Act of the last Session (Note: Gold and Silver Wares Act 1854 (17 & 18 Vict. c. 96)) relating to the Standard of Gold and Silver Wares, and from the Exemptions contained in other Acts relating to Gold Wares. (Repealed by Hallmarking Act 1973 (c. 43))
Second Annual Inclosure Act 1855 or the Inclosure Act 1855 No. 2 or the Commons Inclosure (No. 2) Act 1855	18 & 19 Vict. c. 61	23 July 1855
An Act to authorize the Inclosure of certain Lands in pursuance of a Special Report of the Inclosure Commissioners for England and Wales.
Licensing (Ireland) Act 1855 (repealed)	18 & 19 Vict. c. 62	23 July 1855
An Act to amend an Act of the Eighteenth Year of Her Majesty, (Note: Spirits (Ireland) Act 1854 (17 & 18 Vict. c. 89)) to amend the Laws for the better Prevention of the Sale of Spirits by unlicensed Persons, and for the Suppression of illicit Distillation, in Ireland. (Repealed by Licensing Act (Northern Ireland) 1971 (c. 13 (N.I.)))
Friendly Societies Act 1855 (repealed)	18 & 19 Vict. c. 63	23 July 1855
An Act to consolidate and amend the Law relating to Friendly Societies. (Repealed by Friendly Societies Act 1875 (38 & 39 Vict. c. 60))
Annuity (Lord and Lady Raglan) Act 1855 (repealed)	18 & 19 Vict. c. 64	23 July 1855
An Act to settle Annuities on Emily Harriet Lady Raglan and Richard Henry Fitzroy Lord Raglan, and the next surviving Heir Male of his Body, in consideration of the eminent Services of the late Field Marshal Lord Raglan. (Repealed by Statute Law Revision Act 1953 (2 & 3 Eliz. 2. c. 5))
Dublin Amended Carriage Act 1855 (repealed)	18 & 19 Vict. c. 65	23 July 1855
An Act to amend the Dublin Carriage Acts. (Repealed by Statute Law (Repeals) Act 2013 (c. 2))
Confirmation of Marriages Act 1855 (repealed)	18 & 19 Vict. c. 66	23 July 1855
An Act to render valid certain Marriages in Christ Church in the Chapelry of Todmorden and Parish of Rochdale in the Counties of Lancaster and York. (Repealed by Statute Law (Repeals) Act 1977 (c. 18))
Summary Procedure on Bills of Exchange Act 1855 or Keating's Act (repealed)	18 & 19 Vict. c. 67	23 July 1855
An Act to facilitate the Remedies on Bills of Exchange and Promissory Notes by the Prevention of frivolous or fictitious Defences to Actions thereon. (Repealed by Statute Law Revision and Civil Procedure Act 1883 (46 & 47 Vict. c. 49))
Burial Grounds (Scotland) Act 1855 (repealed)	18 & 19 Vict. c. 68	23 July 1855
An Act to amend the Laws concerning the Burial of the Dead in Scotland. (Repealed by Burial and Cremation (Scotland) Act 2016 (asp 20))
Dublin and other Roads Turnpikes Abolition Act 1855 (repealed)	18 & 19 Vict. c. 69	16 July 1855
An Act to discontinue the taking of Toll on the Turnpike Roads leading from the City of Dublin and on the Turnpike Road from Kinnegad to Athlone, and to provide for the Maintenance of such Roads as public Beads, and for the Discharge of the Debts due thereon, and other Purposes. (Repealed by Statute Law (Repeals) Act 1993 (c. 50))
Public Libraries Act 1855 or the Public Libraries and Museums Act 1855 (repealed)	18 & 19 Vict. c. 70	30 July 1855
An Act for further promoting the Establishment of Free Public Libraries in Municipal Towns, and for extending it to Towns governed under Local Improvement Acts, and to Parishes. (Repealed by Public Libraries Act 1892 (55 & 56 Vict. c. 53))
West India Loans Act 1855 (repealed)	18 & 19 Vict. c. 71	30 July 1855
An Act to authorize the Commissioners of the Treasury to make Arrangements concerning certain Loans advanced by way of Relief to the Islands of Antigua, Nevis, and Montserrat. (Repealed by Statute Law Revision Act 1875 (38 & 39 Vict. c. 66))
Weights and Measures Act 1855 (repealed)	18 & 19 Vict. c. 72	30 July 1855
An Act for legalising and preserving the restored Standards of Weights and Measures. (Repealed by Weights and Measures Act 1878 (41 & 42 Vict. c. 49))
Incumbered Estates (Ireland) Act 1855 (repealed)	18 & 19 Vict. c. 73	30 July 1855
An Act to extend the Period for applying for a Sale under the Acts for facilitating the Sale and Transfer of Incumbered Estates in Ireland. (Repealed by Statute Law Revision Act 1875 (38 & 39 Vict. c. 66))
Treasurers of Counties (Ireland) Act 1855 (repealed)	18 & 19 Vict. c. 74	30 July 1855
An Act to enable Grand Juries of Counties in Ireland to present for Payment of Expenses in certain Cases. (Repealed by Grand Jury (Ireland) Act 1856 (19 & 20 Vict. c. 63))
Ecclesiastical Jurisdiction Act 1855 (repealed)	18 & 19 Vict. c. 75	30 July 1855
An Act to continue certain temporary Provisions concerning Ecclesiastical Jurisdiction in England. (Repealed by Statute Law Revision Act 1875 (38 & 39 Vict. c. 66))
Private Lunatic Asylums (Ireland) Act 1855 (repealed)	18 & 19 Vict. c. 76	30 July 1855
An Act to continue an Act of the Fifth and Sixth Years of Her present Majesty (Note: Private Lunatic Asylums (Ireland) Act 1842 (5 & 6 Vict. c. 123)) for amending the Law relative to Private Lunatic Asylums in Ireland. (Repealed by Statute Law Revision Act 1875 (38 & 39 Vict. c. 66))
Convention with United States Act 1855 (repealed)	18 & 19 Vict. c. 77	30 July 1855
An Act to give Effect to a Convention between Her Majesty and the United States of America. (Repealed by Statute Law Revision Act 1875 (38 & 39 Vict. c. 66))
Inland Revenue Act 1855 (repealed)	18 & 19 Vict. c. 78	30 July 1855
An Act to reduce certain Duties payable on Stage Carriages, and to amend the Laws relating to Stamp Duties, and to Bonds and Securities to the Inland Revenue. (Repealed by Revenue Act 1869 (32 & 33 Vict. c. 14), Inland Revenue Repeal Act 1870 (33 & 34 Vict. c. 99), Inland Revenue Regulation Act 1890 (53 & 54 Vict. c. 21) and Post Office Act 1908 (8 Edw. 7. c. 48))
Poor (Burials) Act 1855 (repealed)	18 & 19 Vict. c. 79	30 July 1855
An Act to amend the Law regarding the Burial of poor Persons by Guardians and Overseers of the Poor. (Repealed by Poor Law Act 1927 (17 & 18 Geo. 5. c. 14))
National Museum of Industry for Scotland and General Register House Act 1855	18 & 19 Vict. c. 80	30 July 1855
An Act to ratify conditional Agreements entered into by the Commissioners of Her Majesty's Works and Public Buildings; and to vest in the said Commissioners certain Property situate near the College of Edinburgh in the City of Edinburgh, together with the General Register House in the said City, and all Lands held therewith; and to enable the said Commissioners to acquire certain Property near the Palace of Holyrood.
Places of Worship Registration Act 1855	18 & 19 Vict. c. 81	30 July 1855
An Act to amend the Law concerning the certifying and registering of Places of Religious Worship in England.
Trinity College, Dublin Act 1855 (repealed)	18 & 19 Vict. c. 82	14 August 1855
An Act to abolish certain Payments charged on the Consolidated Fund in favour of the Provost and Fellows of Trinity College, Dublin, and of certain Professors in the said College; and to repeal the Stamp Duties payable on Matriculations and Degrees in the University of Dublin. (Repealed by Statute Law Revision Act 1875 (38 & 39 Vict. c. 66))
Turnpike Acts (Ireland) Act 1855 (repealed)	18 & 19 Vict. c. 83	14 August 1855
An Act to continue certain Acts for regulating Turnpike Roads in Ireland. (Repealed by Statute Law Revision Act 1875 (38 & 39 Vict. c. 66))
Deputy Speaker Act 1855	18 & 19 Vict. c. 84	14 August 1855
An Act to provide for the Performance of certain Duties of the Speaker during his temporary Absence from the House of Commons.
Slave Trade Suppression, African Treaty Act 1855 (repealed)	18 & 19 Vict. c. 85	14 August 1855
An Act for carrying into effect the Engagements between Her Majesty and certain Chiefs of the Sherbro Country near Sierra Leone in Africa, for the more effectual Suppression of the Slave Trade. (Repealed by Slave Trade Act 1873 (36 & 37 Vict. c. 88))
Liberty of Religious Worship Act 1855 (repealed)	18 & 19 Vict. c. 86	14 August 1855
An Act for securing the Liberty of Religious Worship. (Repealed by Statute Law (Repeals) Act 1989 (c. 43))
Youthful Offenders Act 1855 (repealed)	18 & 19 Vict. c. 87	14 August 1855
An Act to amend the Act (Note: Youthful Offenders Act 1854 (17 & 18 Vict. c. 86)) for the better Care and Reformation of Youthful Offenders, and the Act (Note: Reformatory Schools (Scotland) Act 1854 (17 & 18 Vict. c. 74)) to render Reformatory and Industrial Schools in Scotland more available for the Benefit of Vagrant Children. (Repealed by Reformatory Schools Act 1866 (29 & 30 Vict. c. 117))
Dwelling Houses (Scotland) Act 1855 or the Dwelling Houses for the Working Classes (Scotland) Act 1855 (repealed)	18 & 19 Vict. c. 88	14 August 1855
An Act to facilitate the Erection of Dwelling Houses for the Working Classes in Scotland. (Repealed by Housing of the Working Classes Act 1890 (53 & 54 Vict. c. 70))
Huddersfield Burial Ground Act 1855 (repealed)	18 & 19 Vict. c. 89	14 August 1855
An Act to amend the Provisions of the Huddersfield Burial Ground Act, 1852. (Note: Huddersfield Burial Ground Act 1852 (15 & 16 Vict. c. 41)) (Repealed by West Yorkshire Act 1980 (c. xiv))
Crown Suits Act 1855 (repealed)	18 & 19 Vict. c. 90	14 August 1855
An Act for the Payment of Costs in Proceedings instituted on behalf of the Crown in Matters relating to the Revenue, and for the Amendment of the Procedure and Practice in Crown Suits in the Court of Exchequer. (Repealed by Statute Law (Repeals) Act 1993 (c. 50))
Merchant Shipping Act Amendment Act 1855 or the Merchant Shipping Amendment Act 1855 (repealed)	18 & 19 Vict. c. 91	14 August 1855
An Act to facilitate the Erection and Maintenance of Colonial Lighthouses, and otherwise to amend the Merchant Shipping Act, 1854. (Note: Merchant Shipping Act 1854 (17 & 18 Vict. c. 104)) (Repealed by Merchant Shipping Act 1894 (57 & 58 Vict. c. 60))
Rectory of Ledbury Act 1855	18 & 19 Vict. c. 92	14 August 1855
An Act for appropriating the Corps of the Prebend or Portion of Netherhall Ledbury in the Diocese and County of Hereford, and for constituting the Living of Ledbury a Rectory with Cure of Souls, and for augmenting the Endowments thereof.
Courts in Prince of Wales Island and India Act 1855 (repealed)	18 & 19 Vict. c. 93	14 August 1855
An Act to amend certain Acts relating to the Court of Judicature of Prince of Wales Island^ Singapore, and Malacca, and to the Supreme Courts of Judicature in India. (Repealed by Statute Law Revision Act 1892 (55 & 56 Vict. c. 19))
Excise Act 1855 (repealed)	18 & 19 Vict. c. 94	14 August 1855
An Act to impose increased Rates of Duty of Excise on Spirits distilled in the United Kingdom; to allow Malt, Sugar, and Molasses to be used Duty-free in the distilling of Spirits in lieu of Allowances and Drawbacks on such Spirits, Sugar, and Molasses respectively; and to amend the Laws relating to the Duties of Excise. (Repealed by Inland Revenue Act 1880 (43 & 44 Vict. c. 20))
Downing Street Public Offices Extension Act 1855	18 & 19 Vict. c. 95	14 August 1855
An Act to enable the Commissioners of Her Majesty's Works and Public Buildings to provide additional Offices for the Public Service in or near Downing Street, Westminster.
Supplemental Customs Consolidation Act 1855 or the Supplemental Customs Act 1855 (repealed)	18 & 19 Vict. c. 96	14 August 1855
An Act to consolidate certain Acts, and otherwise amend the Laws of the Customs, and an Act (Note: Office of Receipt of Exchequer Act 1834 (4 & 5 Will. 4. c. 15)) to regulate the Office of the Receipt of Her Majesty's Exchequer at Westminster. (Repealed by Customs Consolidation Act 1876 (39 & 40 Vict. c. 36))
Customs Tariff Act 1855 (repealed)	18 & 19 Vict. c. 97	14 August 1855
An Act for the Amendment and Consolidation of the Customs Tariff Acts. (Repealed by Customs Consolidation Act 1876 (39 & 40 Vict. c. 36))
Annual Turnpike Acts Continuance Act 1855 or the Turnpike Acts, Great Britain Act 1855 (repealed)	18 & 19 Vict. c. 98	14 August 1855
An Act to continue certain Turnpike Acts in Great Britain. (Repealed by Statute Law Revision Act 1875 (38 & 39 Vict. c. 66))
Turkish Loan Act 1855 (repealed)	18 & 19 Vict. c. 99	14 August 1855
An Act to enable Her Majesty to carry into effect a Convention made between Her Majesty, His Majesty the Emperor of the French, and His Imperial Majesty the Sultan. (Repealed by Finance Act 1961 (9 & 10 Eliz. 2. c. 36))
Officers of the Militia Act 1855 (repealed)	18 & 19 Vict. c. 100	14 August 1855
An Act to amend the Law concerning the Qualification of Officers of the Militia. (Repealed by Statute Law Revision Act 1875 (38 & 39 Vict. c. 66))
Fishery Convention with France Act 1855 (repealed)	18 & 19 Vict. c. 101	14 August 1855
An Act for the more effectual Execution of the Convention between Her Majesty and the French Government concerning the Fisheries in the Seas between the British Islands and France. (Repealed by Sea Fisheries Act 1868 (31 & 32 Vict. c. 45))
Provisional Order Confirmation (Turnpikes) Act 1855 (repealed)	18 & 19 Vict. c. 102	14 August 1855
An Act to confirm certain Provisional Orders made under an Act of the Fifteenth Year of Her present Majesty, (Note: Turnpike Trusts (Making of Provisional Orders) Act 1851 (14 & 15 Vict. c. 38)) to facilitate Arrangements for the Relief of Turnpike Trusts. (Repealed by Statute Law (Repeals) Act 1981 (c. 19))
Spirits (Ireland) Act 1855 (repealed)	18 & 19 Vict. c. 103	14 August 1855
An Act to amend an Act of the last Session of Parliament, (Note: Spirits (Ireland) Act 1854 (17 & 18 Vict. c. 89)) relating to the Sale of Spirits by unlicensed Persons and illicit Distillation in Ireland; and also to repeal so much of an Act of the Third and Fourth Years of His late Majesty (Note: Licensing (Ireland) Act 1833 (3 & 4 Will. 4. 68)) as requires Persons applying for Licences for the Sale of Beer, Cider, or Spirits by Retail in Ireland to enter into a Bond with Safeties. (Repealed by Statute Law (Repeals) Act 1977 (c. 18))
Chinese Passengers Act 1855 (repealed)	18 & 19 Vict. c. 104	14 August 1855
An Act for the Regulation of Chinese Passenger Ships. (Repealed by Statute Law (Repeals) Act 1977 (c. 18))
Lunacy Regulation Act 1855 (repealed)	18 & 19 Vict. c. 105	14 August 1855
An Act to amend the Lunatic Asylums Act, 1853, (Note: Lunatic Asylums Act 1853 (16 & 17 Vict. c. 97)) and the Acts passed in the Ninth (Note: Lunacy Act 1845 (8 & 9 Vict. c. 100)) and Seventeenth (Note: Care and Treatment of Lunatics Act 1853 (16 & 17 Vict. c. 96)) Years of Her Majesty, for the Regulation of the Care and Treatment of Lunatics. (Repealed by Lunacy Act 1890 (53 & 54 Vict. c. 5))
Militia Ballot System Act 1855 (repealed)	18 & 19 Vict. c. 106	14 August 1855
An Act to suspend the making of Lists and the Ballots for the Militia of the United Kingdom. (Repealed by Statute Law Revision Act 1875 (38 & 39 Vict. c. 66))
Island of Tobago Loan Act 1855 (repealed)	18 & 19 Vict. c. 107	14 August 1855
An Act to authorize the Commissioners of the Treasury to make Arrangements concerning a certain Loan advanced by way of Relief to the Island of Tobago. (Repealed by Statute Law Revision Act 1875 (38 & 39 Vict. c. 66))
Coal Mines Act 1855 (repealed)	18 & 19 Vict. c. 108	14 August 1855
An Act to amend the Law for the Inspection of Coal Mines in Great Britain. (Repealed by Mines Regulation Act 1860 (23 & 24 Vict. c. 151))
Lunatic Asylums Repayment of Advances (Ireland) Act 1855 (repealed)	18 & 19 Vict. c. 109	14 August 1855
An Act to make further Provisions for the Repayment of Advances out of the Consolidated Fund for the Erection and Enlargement of Asylums for the Lunatic Poor in Ireland, and to amend the Laws with reference to the Repayments in case of Change of Districts, and the Appointment of Commissioners of General Control and Correspondence. (Repealed by Health Services Act (Northern Ireland) 1948 (c. 3 (N.I.)) and Public Works &c Loans Act (Northern Ireland) 1953 (c. 13 (N.I.)))
Drainage and Improvement of Lands (Ireland) Act 1855 (repealed)	18 & 19 Vict. c. 110	14 August 1855
An Act to authorize the Application of certain Sums granted by Parliament for Drainage and other Works of public Utility in Ireland towards the Completion of certain Navigations undertaken in connexion with Drainages, and to amend the Acts for promoting the Drainage of Lands and Improvements in connexion therewith in Ireland. (Repealed by Erne Drainage and Development Act (Northern Ireland) 1950 (c. 15 (N.I.)))
Bills of Lading Act 1855 (repealed)	18 & 19 Vict. c. 111	14 August 1855
An Act to amend the Law relating to Bills of Lading. (Repealed by Carriage of Goods by Sea Act 1992 (c. 50))
Crimes and Outrage (Ireland) Act 1855 (repealed)	18 & 19 Vict. c. 112	14 August 1855
An Act to continue an Act of the Eleventh Year of Her present Majesty, (Note: Prevention of Crime (Ireland) Act 1848 (11 & 12 Vict. c. 2)) for the better Prevention of Crime and Outrage in certain Parts of Ireland. (Repealed by Statute Law Revision Act 1875 (38 & 39 Vict. c. 66))
Inverness Bridge (Treasury Grant) Act 1855 (repealed)	18 & 19 Vict. c. 113	14 August 1855
An Act to extend the Provisions of an Act of the Fourteenth and Fifteenth Years of Her present Majesty, (Note: Highland Roads and Bridges Act 1851 (14 & 15 Vict. c. 66)) for rebuilding the Bridge over the River Ness at Inverness. (Repealed by Statute Law (Repeals) Act 1974 (c. 22))
Public House (Ireland) Act 1855 or the Public Houses (Ireland) Act 1855 (repealed)	18 & 19 Vict. c. 114	14 August 1855
An Act for the Transfer of Licences of Public Houses in Ireland. (Repealed by Customs and Excise Act 1952 (15 & 16 Geo. 6 & 1 Eliz. 2. c. 44))
General Board of Health Continuance Act 1855 or the General Board of Health Continued Act 1855 (repealed)	18 & 19 Vict. c. 115	14 August 1855
An Act to continue and amend the Public Health Act (1854). (Note: Public Health Act 1854 (17 & 18 Vict. c. 95)) (Repealed by Statute Law Revision Act 1875 (38 & 39 Vict. c. 66) and Statute Law Revision Act 1950 (14 Geo. 6. c. 6))
Diseases Prevention Act 1855 (repealed)	18 & 19 Vict. c. 116	14 August 1855
An Act for the better Prevention of Diseases. (Repealed by Public Health (London) Act 1891 (54 & 55 Vict. c. 76) and Statute Law Revision Act 1892 (55 & 56 Vict. c. 19))
Ordnance Board Transfer Act 1855	18 & 19 Vict. c. 117	14 August 1855
An Act for transferring to One of Her Majesty's Principal Secretaries of State the Powers and Estates vested in the Principal Officers of the Ordnance.
Intoxicating Liquors Act 1855 (repealed)	18 & 19 Vict. c. 118	14 August 1855
An Act to repeal the Act of the Seventeenth and Eighteenth Years of the Reign of Her present Majesty (Note: Sale of Beer Act 1854 (17 & 18 Vict. c. 79)) for further regulating the Sale of Beer and other Liquors on the Lord's Day, and to substitute other Provisions in lieu thereof. (Repealed by Licensing Act 1872 (35 & 36 Vict. c. 94))
Passengers Act 1855 (repealed)	18 & 19 Vict. c. 119	14 August 1855
An Act to amend the Law relating to the Carriage of Passengers by Sea. (Repealed by Merchant Shipping Act 1894 (57 & 58 Vict. c. 60))
Metropolis Management Act 1855 or the Metropolis (Management) Act 1855 or the Metropolis Local Management Act 1855	18 & 19 Vict. c. 120	14 August 1855
An Act for the better Local Management of the Metropolis.
Nuisances Removal Act for England 1855 or the Nuisances Removal (England) Act 1855 or the Nuisances Removal and Diseases Prevention Consolidation and Amendment Act 1855 (repealed)	18 & 19 Vict. c. 121	14 August 1855
An Act to consolidate and amend the Nuisances Removal and Disease Prevention Acts, 1848 (Note: Nuisances Removal and Diseases Prevention Act 1848 (11 & 12 Vict. c. 123)) and 1849. (Note: Nuisances Removal and Diseases Prevention Amendment Act 1849 (12 & 13 Vict. c. 111)) (Repealed by Public Health Act 1875 (38 & 39 Vict. c. 55), Public Health (Ireland) Act 1878 (41 & 42 Vict. c. 52) and Public Health (London) Act 1891 (54 & 55 Vict. c. 76))
Metropolitan Building Act 1855 (repealed)	18 & 19 Vict. c. 122	14 August 1855
An Act to amend the Laws relating to the Construction of Buildings in the Metropolis and its Neighbourhood. (Repealed by London Building Act 1894 (57 & 58 Vict. c. ccxiii))
Militia Pay Act 1855 (repealed)	18 & 19 Vict. c. 123	14 August 1855
An Act to defray the Charge of the Pay, Clothing, and contingent and other Expenses of the Disembodied Militia in Great Britain and Ireland; to grant Allowances in certain Cases to Subaltern Officers, Adjutants, Paymasters, Quartermasters, Surgeons, Assistant Surgeons, Surgeons Mates, and Serjeant Majors of the Militia; and to authorize the Employment of the Non-commissioned Officers. (Repealed by Statute Law Revision Act 1875 (38 & 39 Vict. c. 66))
Charitable Trusts Amendment Act 1855 (repealed)	18 & 19 Vict. c. 124	14 August 1855
An Act to amend the Charitable Trusts Act, 1853. (Note: Charitable Trusts Act 1853 (16 & 17 Vict. c. 137)) (Repealed by Charities Act 1960 (8 & 9 Eliz. 2. c. 58))
Public Health Supplemental Act 1855	18 & 19 Vict. c. 125	14 August 1855
An Act to confirm Provisional Orders of the General Board of Health, applying the Public Health Act (1848) (Note: Public Health Act 1848 (11 & 12 Vict. c. 63)) to the Districts of Middlesbrough, Windhill, Christchurch, Keighley, Tunstall, and Toxteth Park, and for Alteration of the Boundaries of the District of Romford.
	Provisional Order for the Application of the Public Health Act to the Borough of Middlesbrough, in the North Riding of the County of York.	
	Provisional Order for the Application of the Public Health Act to the District of Windhill, in the County of York.	
	Provisional Order for the Application of the Public Health Act, 1848, to the District of Christchurch, in the County of Monmouth.	
	Provisional Order for the Application of the Public Health Act, 1848, to the Town of Keighley, in the West Riding of the County of York.	
	Provisional Order for the Application of the Public Health Act to the Township of Tunstall, in the County of Stafford.	
	Provisional Order for the Application of the Public Health Act to the Extra-parochial Place of Toxteth Park, in the County Palatine of Lancaster.	
	Provisional Order for altering the Boundaries of the District of Romford, in the County of Essex, as constituted for the Purposes of the Public Health Act, 1848.	
Criminal Justice Act 1855 (repealed)	18 & 19 Vict. c. 126	14 August 1855
An Act for diminishing Expense and Delay in the Administration of Criminal Justice in certain Cases. (Repealed by Metropolitan Police Magistrates Act 1875 (38 & 39 Vict. c. 3), Statute Law Revision (Substituted Enactments) Act 1876 (39 & 40 Vict. c. 20), Summary Jurisdiction Act 1879 (42 & 43 Vict. c. 49), Supreme Court of Judicature (Officers) Act 1879 (42 & 43 Vict. c. 78) and Statute Law Revision Act 1892 (55 & 56 Vict. c. 19), for England and Wales by Theft Act 1968 (c. 60) and for Northern Ireland by Costs in Criminal Cases Act (Northern Ireland) 1968 (c. 10 (N.I.)) and Criminal Injuries to Persons (Compensation) Act (Northern Ireland) 1968 (c. 9 (N.I.)))
Union of Benefices, etc. Act 1855 (repealed)	18 & 19 Vict. c. 127	14 August 1855
An Act to make better Provision for the Union of contiguous Benefices, and to facilitate the building and endowing of new Churches in spiritually destitute Districts. (Repealed by Statute Law Revision Act 1875 (38 & 39 Vict. c. 66))
Burial Act 1855	18 & 19 Vict. c. 128	14 August 1855
An Act further to amend the Laws concerning the Burial of the Dead in England.
Appropriation Act 1855 (repealed)	18 & 19 Vict. c. 129	14 August 1855
An Act to apply a Sum out of the Consolidated Fund and the Surplus of Ways and Means to the Service of the Year One thousand eight hundred and fifty-five, and to appropriate the Supplies granted in this Session of Parliament. (Repealed by Statute Law Revision Act 1875 (38 & 39 Vict. c. 66))
Exchequer Bills and Bonds Act 1855 (repealed)	18 & 19 Vict. c. 130	14 August 1855
An Act for raising the Sum of Seven Millions by Exchequer Bills and Exchequer Bonds, for the Service of the Year One thousand eight hundred and fifty-five. (Repealed by Statute Law Revision Act 1875 (38 & 39 Vict. c. 66))
School Grants Act 1855	18 & 19 Vict. c. 131	14 August 1855
An Act to render more secure the Conditions upon which Money is advanced out of the Parliamentary Grant for the Purposes of Education. (Repealed for Scotland by Education (Scotland) Act 1945 (8 & 9 Geo. 6. c. 37))
Labourers Dwellings Act 1855 (repealed)	18 & 19 Vict. c. 132	14 August 1855
An Act for facilitating the Erection of Dwelling Houses for the Labouring Classes. (Repealed by Statute Law Revision Act 1875 (38 & 39 Vict. c. 66))
Limited Liability Act 1855 (repealed)	18 & 19 Vict. c. 133	14 August 1855
An Act for limiting the Liability of Members of certain Joint Stock Companies. (Repealed by Statute Law Revision Act 1875 (38 & 39 Vict. c. 66))
Court of Chancery Act 1855 (repealed)	18 & 19 Vict. c. 134	14 August 1855
An Act to make further Provision for the more speedy and efficient Despatch of Business in the High Court of Chancery, and to vest in the Lord Chancellor the Ground and Buildings of the said Court situate in Southampton Buildings, Chancery Lane, with Powers of leasing and Sale thereof. (Repealed by Supreme Court of Judicature (Consolidation) Act 1925 (15 & 16 Geo. 5. c. 49))

=== Local acts ===
Short title	Citation	Royal assent
Long title
Pudsey Gas Act 1855 (repealed)	18 & 19 Vict. c. i	26 April 1855
An Act to amend "The Pudsey Gas Act, 1845," (Note: Pudsey Gas Act 1845 (8 & 9 Vict. c. lxiii)) and to enable the Company thereby incorporated to raise a further Sum of Money. (Repealed by West Yorkshire Act 1980 (c. xiv))
Woolwich, Plumstead and Charlton Consumers Gas Act 1855	18 & 19 Vict. c. ii	26 April 1855
An Act for incorporating the Woolwich, Plumstead, and Charlton Consumers Gas Company.
Cambridge University and Town Waterworks (Capital) Act 1855 (repealed)	18 & 19 Vict. c. iii	26 April 1855
An Act to enable the Cambridge University and Town Waterworks Company to raise further Money. (Repealed by Cambridge Waterworks Order 1959 (SI 1959/1131))
Taunton Gas Act 1855	18 & 19 Vict. c. iv	26 April 1855
An Act to enable the Taunton Gaslight and Coke Company to raise a further Sum of Money, and for other Purposes.
Hoarwithy Bridge Act 1855	18 & 19 Vict. c. v	26 April 1855
An Act for erecting and maintaining a Bridge over the River Wye at a Place called Hoarwithy Ferry, in the Parishes of Hentland and King's Caple in the County of Hereford, and for making convenient Approaches thereto.
Brighton Commissioners Transfer Act 1855 (repealed)	18 & 19 Vict. c. vi	5 May 1855
An Act to transfer to the Corporation of the Town of Brighton the Property, Powers, Privileges, and Liabilities of the Brighton Improvement Commissioners. (Repealed by Brighton Corporation Act 1931 (21 & 22 Geo. 5. c. cix))
Folkestone Waterworks Amendment Act 1855	18 & 19 Vict. c. vii	5 May 1855
An Act for granting further Powers to the Folkestone Waterworks Company.
Stalybridge Gas Act 1855	18 & 19 Vict. c. viii	5 May 1855
An Act for more effectually lighting with Gas the Town of Stalybridge and the Neighbourhood thereof in the Counties of Chester and Lancaster and in the West Riding of the County of York.
Ossett Gas Act 1855 (repealed)	18 & 19 Vict. c. ix	5 May 1855
An Act for supplying with Gas the Townships of Ossett-cum-Gawthorpe in the Parish of Dewsbury, and Horbury in the Parish of Wakefield, all in the West Riding of the County of York. (Repealed by Ossett Corporation Gas Act 1900 (63 & 64 Vict. c. lxv))
Monmouthshire Railway and Canal Act 1855	18 & 19 Vict. c. x	5 May 1855
An Act for enabling the Monmouthshire Railway and Canal Company to raise further Capital, and for other Purposes.
Bridport Railway Act 1855	18 & 19 Vict. c. xi	5 May 1855
An Act for constructing a Railway from Bridport to Maiden Newton, on the Wilts, Somerset, and Weymouth Railway, in the County of Dorset.
Ratcliff Gas Act 1855	18 & 19 Vict. c. xii	5 May 1855
An Act to consolidate and amend the Provisions of the Act (Note: Middlesex Gas Act 1823 (4 Geo. 4. c. xcviii)) relating to the Ratcliff Gaslight and Coke Company.
Leeds, Bradford and Halifax Junction Railway Act 1855	18 & 19 Vict. c. xiii	5 May 1855
An Act to enable the Leeds, Bradford, and Halifax Junction Railway Company to raise additional Capital; and for other Purposes.
Sheffield Gas Act 1855 (repealed)	18 & 19 Vict. c. xiv	5 May 1855
An Act for merging the Sheffield Gas Consumers Company in the Sheffield United Gaslight Company, and for other Purposes. (Repealed by Sheffield Gas (Consolidation) Act 1929 (19 & 20 Geo. 5. c. xii))
Glossop Gas (Capital) Act 1855	18 & 19 Vict. c. xv	25 May 1855
An Act to authorise the Glossop Gas Company to raise Money, and for other Purposes.
South Eastern Railway Act 1855	18 & 19 Vict. c. xvi	25 May 1855
An Act to enable the South-eastern Railway Company to raise a further Sum of Money, and to create Preferential Stock, for the Purpose of paying off their Mortgage Debt.
Dursley and Midland Junction Railway Act 1855	18 & 19 Vict. c. xvii	25 May 1855
An Act for making a Railway from the Midland Railway in the Parish of Cam in the County of Gloucester to the Town of Dursley.
Belfast and County Down Railway Act 1855	18 & 19 Vict. c. xviii	25 May 1855
An Act to enable the Belfast and County Down Railway Company to extend their Railway in the County of Down.
Colchester, Stour Valley, Sudbury and Halstead Railway Amendment Act 1855	18 & 19 Vict. c. xix	25 May 1855
All Act to grant further Powers to "The Colchester, Stour Valley, Sudbury, and Halstead Railway Company."
Heywood Waterworks Amendment Act 1855	18 & 19 Vict. c. xx	25 May 1855
An Act to enable the Heywood Waterworks Company to extend their Undertaking, and to increase their Capital.
Grand Junction Waterworks Act 1855	18 & 19 Vict. c. xxi	25 May 1855
An Act for enabling the Grand Junction Waterworks Company to raise further Capital, and for other Purposes.
Price's Patent Candle Company's Act 1855 (repealed)	18 & 19 Vict. c. xxii	25 May 1855
An Act to re-incorporate Prices Patent Candle Company, and to extend its Powers. (Repealed by Price's Patent Candle Company's Act 1857 (20 Vict. c. ii))
South Wales Mineral Railway (Lease) Act 1855	18 & 19 Vict. c. xxiii	25 May 1855
An Act to enable the South Wales Mineral Railway Company to grant a Lease of their Undertaking.
Southwark and Vauxhall Water Act 1855	18 & 19 Vict. c. xxiv	25 May 1855
An Act for enabling the Southwark and Vauxhall Water Company to raise additional Capital, and for other Purposes.
Vale of Neath Railway (Capital) Act 1855	18 & 19 Vict. c. xxv	25 May 1855
An Act to empower the Vale of Neath Railway Company to raise further Money for the Purposes of their Undertaking.
Woolwich Equitable Gas Company's Act 1855	18 & 19 Vict. c. xxvi	25 May 1855
An Act to incorporate the Woolwich Equitable Gas Company, and to enable them to raise further Money; and for other Purposes.
Torquay Market Act 1855	18 & 19 Vict. c. xxvii	25 May 1855
An Act to enable the Torquay Market Company to raise a further Sum of Money, to sell or lease their Undertaking, and for other Purposes.
Great North of Scotland Railway Extension Act 1855 (repealed)	18 & 19 Vict. c. xxviii	25 May 1855
An Act to extend the Great North of Scotland Railway from Huntly to Keith. (Repealed by Great North of Scotland Railway Consolidation Act 1859 (22 & 23 Vict. c. viii))
Chesterfield Waterworks and Gaslight Company's Act 1855 (repealed)	18 & 19 Vict. c. xxix	25 May 1855
An Act to enable the Chesterfield Waterworks and Gaslight Company to extend their Undertaking; and for other Purposes. (Repealed by Chesterfield Corporation Act 1923 (13 & 14 Geo. 5. c. xcix))
Jedburgh Railway Act 1855 (repealed)	18 & 19 Vict. c. xxx	25 May 1855
An Act for making a Railway from the Town of Jedburgh to the Kelso Branch of the North British Railway at or near the Roxburgh Station, and for other Purposes. (Repealed by North British and Jedburgh Railways Amalgamation Act 1860 (23 & 24 Vict. c. cxl))
Bangor Markets and Public Institutions Act 1855	18 & 19 Vict. c. xxxi	25 May 1855
An Act for constructing a Market House, Market Place, and other Buildings for public Accommodation at Bangor in the County of Carnarvon, and for the better Regulation and Maintenance of the Markets there, and for other Purposes.
Rotherham Gaslight Act 1855 (repealed)	18 & 19 Vict. c. xxxii	25 May 1855
An Act for more effectually supplying with Gas the Parish of Rotherham and certain Places adjacent thereto in the West Riding of the County of York. (Repealed by Statute Law (Repeals) Act 1989 (c. 43))
Medical, Invalid and General Life Assurance Society's Act 1855	18 & 19 Vict. c. xxxiii	25 May 1855
An Act for better enabling the Medical, Invalid, and General Life Assurance Society to sue and be sued, and for other Purposes with relation to the Society.
Birmingham Waterworks Act 1855 (repealed)	18 & 19 Vict. c. xxxiv	25 May 1855
An Act to enable the Company of Proprietors of the Birmingham Waterworks to construct new Waterworks; and for other Purposes. (Repealed by Birmingham Corporation (Consolidation) Act 1883 (46 & 47 Vict. c. lxx))
Plymouth and Stonehouse Gas Act 1855	18 & 19 Vict. c. xxxv	25 May 1855
An Act for extending the Powers of the Plymouth and Stonehouse Gaslight and Coke Company; and for other Purposes.
Surbiton Improvement Act 1855 (repealed)	18 & 19 Vict. c. xxxvi	25 May 1855
An Act for paving, draining, cleansing, lighting, and otherwise improving the District of Saint Mark, Surbiton, in the Parish of Kingston-upon-Thames in the County of Surrey; and for other Purposes. (Repealed by Local Law (South West London Boroughs) Order 1965 (SI 1965/532))
Stourbridge Gas Act 1855	18 & 19 Vict. c. xxxvii	25 May 1855
An Act to incorporate the Stourbridge Gas Company, and to enable them to light with Gas the Town of Stourbridge in Worcestershire and other Places.
East Indian Railway Act 1855 (repealed)	18 & 19 Vict. c. xxxviii	25 May 1855
An Act to enable the East Indian Railway Company to issue and register Shares and Securities in India; and for other Purposes in relation to such Company. (Repealed by Statute Law (Repeals) Act 2013 (c. 2))
Uxbridge Burgage Lands Act 1855	18 & 19 Vict. c. xxxix	25 May 1855
An Act for authorizing the Sale of the Uxbridge Burgage Lands, and directing the Application of the Proceeds thereof, and for other Purposes.
Madras Railway Act 1855 (repealed)	18 & 19 Vict. c. xl	15 June 1855
An Act to enable the Madras Railway Company to issue and register Shares and Securities in India, and for other Purposes in relation to such Company. (Repealed by Statute Law (Repeals) Act 2013 (c. 2))
Newport (Monmouthshire) Corporation Act 1855	18 & 19 Vict. c. xli	15 June 1855
An Act to enable the Corporation of Newport in Monmouthshire to purchase the Interest of the Freemen in Newport Marshes, and for other Purposes.
Lancaster Waterworks and Gas Amendment Act 1855 (repealed)	18 & 19 Vict. c. xlii	15 June 1855
An Act to amend "The Lancaster Waterworks and Gas Act, 1852," (Note: Lancaster Waterworks and Gas Act 1852 (15 & 16 Vict. c. lxvii)) and to raise an additional Sum of Money for the Purposes of the said Act; and for other Purposes. (Repealed by Lune Valley Water Board Order 1960 (SI 1960/2148))
Over Darwen Gas Act 1855 (repealed)	18 & 19 Vict. c. xliii	15 June 1855
An Act to amend the Provisions and extend the Limits of the Act (Note: Over Darwen Gas Act 1839 (2 & 3 Vict. c. lxxx)) relating to the Over Darwen Gaslight Compaay. (Repealed by County of Lancashire Act 1984 (c. xxi))
Manchester Improvement Act 1855	18 & 19 Vict. c. xliv	15 June 1855
An Act for enabling the Mayor, Aldermen, and Citizens of the City of Manchester to make a new Street from Manchester across the River Irwell into Salford; and authorizing Arrangements with the Corporation of Salford in reference thereto; and for other Purposes.
Kingston-upon-Thames Improvement Act 1855	18 & 19 Vict. c. xlv	15 June 1855
An Act to extend the Limits of the Borough of Kingston-upon-Thames, and to provide for the better paving, lighting, draining, and otherwise improving the said Borough; and for other Purposes.
Plymouth Great Western Docks Act 1855	18 & 19 Vict. c. xlvi	15 June 1855
An Act for extending the Powers of The Plymouth Great Western Dock Company, and for other Purposes.
Oldham Corporation Gas and Water Act 1855	18 & 19 Vict. c. xlvii	15 June 1855
An Act to authorize the Mayor, Aldermen, and Burgesses of the Borough of Oldham to construct additional Waterworks; and for other Purposes.
Birmingham Gas Act 1855 (repealed)	18 & 19 Vict. c. xlviii	15 June 1855
An Act to confer further Powers on the Birmingham Gaslight and Coke Company. (Repealed by Birmingham Corporation (Consolidation) Act 1883 (46 & 47 Vict. c. lxx))
Hartlepool Gas and Waterworks Act 1855 (repealed)	18 & 19 Vict. c. xlix	15 June 1855
An Act for repealing an Act called "The Hartlepool Gas and Waterworks Act, 1849," (Note: Hartlepool Gas and Waterworks Act 1849 (12 & 13 Vict. c. xxv)) and granting other Powers in lieu thereof; and for enabling the Hartlepool Gas and Water Company to raise further Money, and for other Purposes; the Short Title of which is "The Hartlepool Gas and Waterworks Act, 1855." (Repealed by Hartlepool Gas and Water Act 1867 (30 & 31 Vict. c. xxxii))
Llynvi Valley Railway Act 1855	18 & 19 Vict. c. l	15 June 1855
An Act to consolidate and amend the Acts relating to the Llynvi Valley Railway Company; to enable them to construct a new Railway from Llangonoyd to Bridgend, and to extend their present Line from Foce Toll House to Saint Bride's Minor, to abandon Parts of their existing and authorized Lines, to dissolve the Bridgend Railway Company, and to abandon their Railway; and for other Purposes.
Kelso Bridge Amendment Act 1855	18 & 19 Vict. c. li	15 June 1855
An Act for further and more effectually repairing and maintaining the Bridge over the River Tweed at or near the Town of Kelso in the County of Roxburgh.
St. George's Harbour Act Amendment Act 1855	18 & 19 Vict. c. lii	15 June 1855
An Act to amend "The St. George's Harbour Act, 1853." (Note: St. George's Harbour Act 1853 (16 & 17 Vict. c. ccxiii))
Ulster Railway Act 1855	18 & 19 Vict. c. liii	15 June 1855
An Act to enable the Ulster Railway Company to make a Railway from Armagh to Monaghan, and to enlarge their Station at Belfast; and for other Purposes.
Londonderry Improvement Act 1855	18 & 19 Vict. c. liv	15 June 1855
An Act for enabling the Mayor, Aldermen, and Burgesses of Londonderry to raise a further Sum of Money; and for other Purposes.
Kilmarnock Gaslight Act 1855	18 & 19 Vict. c. lv	15 June 1855
An Act to incorporate "The Kilmarnock Gaslight Company," established to supply with Gas the Town of Kilmarnock, and the Parishes of Kilmarnock and Riccarton, and Places therein, all in the County of Ayr.
Dundee and Perth and Aberdeen Railway Junction (Consolidation) Act 1855	18 & 19 Vict. c. lvi	15 June 1855
An Act for consolidating into One Act and amending the Provisions of the several Acts relating to the Dundee and Perth and Aberdeen Railway Junction Company; and for enabling the Company to raise Money for the Payment of Debts; and for other Purposes.
Banff, Macduff and Turriff Junction Railway Act 1855	18 & 19 Vict. c. lvii	15 June 1855
An Act for making a Railway from the Great North of Scotland Railway to Turriff in the County oi Aberdeen.
Swansea Dock Amendment Act 1855	18 & 19 Vict. c. lviii	15 June 1855
An Act to authorize certain Arrangements with respect to the Capital of the Swansea Dock Company.
Cornwall Railway Act 1855 (repealed)	18 & 19 Vict. c. lix	15 June 1855
An Act for extending the Time for the Completion of the Cornwall Railway and Works; and for making further Provisions as to the Share Capital of the Cornwall Railway Company; and for other Purposes. (Repealed by Cornwall Railway Act 1861 (24 & 25 Vict. c. ccxv))
Swansea Vale Railway Act 1855	18 & 19 Vict. c. lx	15 June 1855
An Act to enable the Swansea Vale Railway Company to extend their Railway, and to maintain and work the same as a Passenger Railway, and for other Purposes connected therewith.
Leominster and Ledbury Road Act 1855	18 & 19 Vict. c. lxi	15 June 1855
An Act to repeal the Act (Note: Leominster and Ledbury Road Act 1825 (6 Geo. 4. c. xxvi)) relating to the Leominster and Ledbury Turnpike Trust, and to make other Provisions in lieu thereof.
Salisbury and Yeovil Railway Deviation Act 1855	18 & 19 Vict. c. lxii	15 June 1855
An Act to enable the Salisbury and Yeovil Railway Company to make a Deviation in the Line of their Railway; and for other Purposes.
Bristol and Exeter Railway Act 1855	18 & 19 Vict. c. lxiii	15 June 1855
An Act to enlarge some of the Powers of the Acts relating to the Bristol and Exeter Railway Company; and to enable such Company to raise further Sums of Money, to acquire additional Lands, to lease the Somerset Central Railway, to hold additional Shares in the Exeter and Crediton Railway; and for other Purposes.
Hyde Gas Act 1855	18 & 19 Vict. c. lxiv	15 June 1855
An Act to incorporate the Hyde Gas Company, and to grant more effectual Powers for supplying with Gras the several Townships of Hyde, Werneth, Bredbury, Romiley, Newton, and Godley in the County of Chester.
Inverury and Old Meldrum Junction Railway Act 1855	18 & 19 Vict. c. lxv	15 June 1855
An Act for making a Railway from and out of the Great North of Scotland Railway in the Parish of Inverury to the Town of Old Meldrum, all in the County at Aberdeen; and for other Purposes.
Liverpool Corporation Waterworks Act 1855	18 & 19 Vict. c. lxvi	15 June 1855
An Act for amending the several Acts relating to the Liverpool Corporation Waterworks, and for authorizing Deviations and the Construction of Works; and for other Purposes.
Commercial Roads Amendment Act 1855	18 & 19 Vict. c. lxvii	15 June 1855
An Act for amending "The Commercial Roads Act, 1828," (Note: Commercial and East India and Barking Roads Act 1828 (9 Geo. 4. c. cxii)) and "The Commercial Roads Continuation Act, 1849," (Note: Commercial Roads Continuation Act 1849 (12 & 13 Vict. c. lxxvi)) and for other Purposes.
Kingston-upon-Hull, Hessle and Ferriby Turnpike Road Act 1855 (repealed)	18 & 19 Vict. c. lxviii	15 June 1855
An Act for repairing the Road from the Town of Kingston-upon-Hull to the Western Boundary of the Parish of Hessle in the East Riding of the County of York. (Repealed by Annual Turnpike Acts Continuance Act 1873 (36 & 37 Vict. c. 90))
Abingdon Railway Act 1855	18 & 19 Vict. c. lxix	15 June 1855
An Act for making a Railway from the Oxford Branch of the Great Western Railway to Abingdon.
Ashton-under-Lyne Corporation Waterworks Act 1855 (repealed)	18 & 19 Vict. c. lxx	15 June 1855
An Act for enabling the Mayor, Aldermen, and Burgesses of the Borough of Ashton-under-Lyne in the County of Lancaster to purchase and maintain Waterworks; and for other Purposes. (Repealed by Ashton-under-Lyne, Stalybridge and Dukinfield (District) Waterworks Act 1870 (33 & 34 Vict. c. cxxxi))
Nottingham and Loughborough Road Act 1855	18 & 19 Vict. c. lxxi	15 June 1855
An Act to repeal the Act (Note: Road from Trent Bridge to Cotes Bridge Act 1824 (5 Geo. 4. c. xlvi)) relating to the Nottingham and Loughborough Turnpike Road, and to make other Provisions in lieu thereof.
Renfrew Police and Improvement Act 1855	18 & 19 Vict. c. lxxii	15 June 1855
An Act for establishing and maintaining an efficient System of Police for the Royal Burgh of Renfrew, for improving the said Burgh, and for other Purposes in relation thereto.
Waterford and Limerick Railway Act 1855	18 & 19 Vict. c. lxxiii	26 June 1855
An Act to enable the Waterford and Limerick Railway Company to raise further Money; and for other Purposes.
Saint Helens Improvement Act 1855 or the St. Helens Improvement Act 1855 (repealed)	18 & 19 Vict. c. lxxiv	26 June 1855
An Act for the Improvement of the Town of Saint Helen's, and for other Purposes. (Repealed by St. Helens Improvement Act 1869 (32 & 33 Vict. c. cxx))
Cromford and High Peak Railway Act 1855	18 & 19 Vict. c. lxxv	26 June 1855
An Act to alter and extend the Line of the Cromford and High Peak Railway, and to amend and consolidate the Provisions of the Acts relating thereto.
Limerick and Castleconnell Railway Act 1855	18 & 19 Vict. c. lxxvi	26 June 1855
An Act for making a Railway from the Waterford and Limerick Railway at Killonan to Castleconnell, to be called "The Limerick and Castleconnell Railway;" and for other Purposes.
Newcastle-under-Lyme Gaslight Act 1855	18 & 19 Vict. c. lxxvii	26 June 1855
An Act to extend the limits of the Newcastle-under-Lyme Gaslight Company's Act (Note: Newcastle-under-Lyme Gas Act 1819 (59 Geo. 3. c. cvii)) for the Supply of Gas, and to authorize the raising of a further Sum of Money, and for other Purposes.
Limerick and Foynes Railway Act 1855	18 & 19 Vict. c. lxxviii	26 June 1855
An Act to increase the borrowing Powers of the Limerick and Foynes Railway Company.
Maryport and Carlisle Railway Act 1855	18 & 19 Vict. c. lxxix	26 June 1855
An Act to consolidate and amend the Acts relating to the Maryport and Carlisle Railway; to authorize the Company to improve their existing Railway; to make new Branches, Stations, and other Additions to their Works; to raise further Monies; and for other Purposes.
Newport (Monmouthshire) Gas Act 1855	18 & 19 Vict. c. lxxx	26 June 1855
An Act for better lighting with Gas the Town and Borough of Newport, and the Neighbourhood thereof, in the County of Monmouth.
Weston-super-Mare Gaslight Act 1855	18 & 19 Vict. c. lxxxi	26 June 1855
An Act for more effectually supplying with Gas the Town of Weston-super-Mare in the County of Somerset.
Alford and Boston Road Act 1855	18 & 19 Vict. c. lxxxii	26 June 1855
An Act to renew the Term and continue the Powers of an Act passed in the Eighth Year of the Reign of His Majesty King George the Fourth, intituled "An Act for repairing the Road from Alford to Boston, and from thence to Cowbridge in the Township of Frithville, in the County of Lincoln." (Note: Alford and Boston Road Act 1827 (7 & 8 Geo. 4. c. xvii))
Wigan and Preston Roads North of Yarrow Act 1855	18 & 19 Vict. c. lxxxiii	26 June 1855
An Act to repeal so much of the Act (Note: Wigan and Preston Roads Act 1822 (3 Geo. 4. c. iii)) relating to the Wigan and Preston Roads as relates to tho District of the said Roads North of Yarrow, and to make other Provisions in lieu thereof.
Lands Improvement Company's Amendment Act 1855	18 & 19 Vict. c. lxxxiv	26 June 1855
An Act to alter and amend "The Lands Improvement Company's Act, 1853." (Note: Lands Improvement Company's Act 1853 (16 & 17 Vict. c. cliv))
Charlbury Roads Act 1855 (repealed)	18 & 19 Vict. c. lxxxv	26 June 1855
An Act to renew the Term and continue the Powers of an Act passed in the First Year of the Reign of His Majesty King George the Fourth, (Note: Witney and Charlbury Roads (Oxfordshire) Act 1820 (1 Geo. 4. c. lxxxii)) intituled "An Act to continue the Term and alter and enlarge the Powers of an Act of the Fortieth Year of His late Majesty's Reign, (Note: Witney and Woodstock Roads Act 1800 (39 & 40 Geo. 3. c. xvi)) for repairing the Road leading from the Turnpike Road in Witney to the Road on Swerford Heath, and the Road leading from the Road from Woodstock to Birmingham through Charlbury to the Road from Chipping Norton to Burford, all in the County of Oxford." (Repealed by Statute Law (Repeals) Act 2013 (c. 2))
Oswestry, Welchpool and Newtown Railway Act 1855 or the Oswestry, Welshpool and Newtown Railway Act 1855	18 & 19 Vict. c. lxxxvi	26 June 1855
An Act for making a Railway from Oswestry in the County of Salop to Welchpool and Newtown in the County of Montgomery.
Lyme Regis Turnpike Road Act 1855	18 & 19 Vict. c. lxxxvii	26 June 1855
An Act for repairing, widening, and maintaining several Roads in the Counties of Dorset and Devon leading to and from the Borough of Lyme Regis, and from the Turnpike Road on Raymond's Hill to the Turnpike Road at the Three Ashes in the Parish of Crewherne in the County of Somerset.
Dundalk and Black Rock Railway Act 1855	18 & 19 Vict. c. lxxxviii	26 June 1855
An Act for making a Railway from the Town of Dundalk in the County of Louth to the Town of Black Rock in the said County.
Gloucester Waterworks Act 1855	18 & 19 Vict. c. lxxxix	26 June 1855
An Act for the better Supply of tho City of Gloucester and the Neighbourhood thereof with Water; and for other Purposes.
London and Blackwall Railway Act 1855	18 & 19 Vict. c. xc	26 June 1855
An Act for enabling the London and Blackwall Railway Company to widen certain Portions of their Railways, and for amending some of the Provisions of the Acts relating to such Railways.
Manchester, Sheffield and Lincolnshire Railway (Lincoln Branch, &c.) Act 1855	18 & 19 Vict. c. xci	26 June 1855
An Act for enabling the Manchester, Sheffield, and Lincolnshire Railway Company to make a Branch Railway to Lincoln, and for other Purposes.
Nottingham and Newhaven Turnpike Road Act 1855	18 & 19 Vict. c. xcii	26 June 1855
An Act for continuing the Term of the Nottingham and Newhaven Turnpike Road and Districts Act, and for other Purposes.
Warrington Waterworks Act 1855	18 & 19 Vict. c. xciii	26 June 1855
An Act for extending the Powers of the Warrington Waterworks Company, and for other Purposes.
East Kent Railway Act 1855	18 & 19 Vict. c. xciv	26 June 1855
An Act to amend the East Kent Railway Act, 1853. (Note: East Kent Railway Act 1853 (16 & 17 Vict. c. cxxxii))
Regent's and Hertford Union Canals Act 1855	18 & 19 Vict. c. xcv	26 June 1855
An Act to authorize the Company of Proprietors of the Regent's Canal to purchase the Hertford Union Canal; and for other Purposes.
Caledonian Railway (Plant and Station Accommodation) Act 1855	18 & 19 Vict. c. xcvi	26 June 1855
An Act to enable the Caledonian Railway Company to raise a further Sum of Money.
Glasgow and South Western Railway Consolidation Act 1855	18 & 19 Vict. c. xcvii	26 June 1855
An Act to consolidate and amend the Acts relating to the Glasgow and South-western Railway, and for other Purposes.
South Wales Railway Consolidation Act 1855	18 & 19 Vict. c. xcviii	26 June 1855
An Act to consolidate and amend the Acts relating to the South Wales Railway Company, and to authorize the Construction of new Works, and Alterations of existing Works, and for other Purposes.
Newcastle-upon-Tyne Improvement Act 1855	18 & 19 Vict. c. xcix	26 June 1855
An Act to authorize Improvements in the Borough of Newcastle-upon-Tyne.
Newton District Improvement Act 1855 (repealed)	18 & 19 Vict. c. c	26 June 1855
An Act for the Improvement of the Town of Newton in Mackerfield and Neighbourhood in the County of Lancaster. (Repealed by Merseyside Act 1980 (c. cx))
Cork and Youghal Railway (Queenstown Branch, &c.) Act 1855	18 & 19 Vict. c. ci	2 July 1855
An Act to enable the Cork and Youghal Railway Company to make a Branch Railway to Queenstown, and to make certain Deviations in and an Extension of their Line; and for other Purposes.
Metropolitan Railway (Deviation) Act 1855	18 & 19 Vict. c. cii	2 July 1855
An Act to alter certain Portions of the Metropolitan Railway, and to amend the Provisions of the Act (Note: Metropolitan Railway Act 1854 (17 & 18 Vict. c. ccxxi)) relating thereto.
Gomersal and Dewsbury Turnpike Roads Act 1855 (repealed)	18 & 19 Vict. c. ciii	2 July 1855
An Act to amend and extend the Provisions of the Act (Note: Gomersal and Dewsbury Roads (Yorks. West Riding) Act 1826 (7 Geo. 4. c. xciii)) relating to the Gomersal and Dewsbury Turnpike Roads, and to create a further Term therein; and for other Purposes. (Repealed by Annual Turnpike Acts Continuance Act 1867 (30 & 31 Vict. c. 121))
Basingstoke, Stockbridge and Lobcomb Corner Turnpike Roads Act 1855	18 & 19 Vict. c. civ	2 July 1855
An Act to repeal certain Acts relating to the Basingstoke, Stockbridge, and Lobcomb Comer Turnpike Roads, and to make other Provisions in lieu thereof.
Dundalk and Enniskillen Railway Extensions Act 1855	18 & 19 Vict. c. cv	2 July 1855
An Act to enable the Dundalk and Enniskillen Railway Company to construct Extension Railways; and for other Purposes.
Lightpill and Birdlip Road Act 1855 (repealed)	18 & 19 Vict. c. cvi	2 July 1855
An Act to repeal the Acts relating to the Road from Lightpill to Birdlip, and make other Provisions in lieu thereof. (Repealed by Statute Law (Repeals) Act 2013 (c. 2))
Peterborough and Wellingborough Turnpike Road Act 1855 (repealed)	18 & 19 Vict. c. cvii	2 July 1855
An Act to repeal the Act (Note: Peterborough and Wellingborough Road Act 1823 (4 Geo. 4. c. viii)) relating to the Peterborough and Wellingborough Turnpike Road, and to make other Provisions in lieu thereof. (Repealed by Annual Turnpike Acts Continuance Act 1871 (34 & 35 Vict. c. 115))
Stroud, Cainscross and Minchinhampton Road Act 1855 (repealed)	18 & 19 Vict. c. cviii	2 July 1855
An Act to repeal the Act (Note: Cainscross and Minchinhampton Turnpike Road Act 1825 (6 Geo. 4. c. xxiii)) for making and maintaining a Turnpike Road from Cainscross through Stroud over Rodborough and Minchinhampton Commons to the Town of Minchinhampton, with some Branches therefrom, all in the County of Gloucester, and to make other Provisions in lieu thereof. (Repealed by Statute Law (Repeals) Act 2013 (c. 2))
Stroud and Chalford Turnpike Roads Act 1855 (repealed)	18 & 19 Vict. c. cix	2 July 1855
An Act to repeal an Act (Note: Roads from Stroud Act 1814 (54 Geo. 3. c. lxxx)) for making and maintaining certain Roads from the Town of Stroud and several other Places therein mentioned, all in the County of Gloucester, and to make other Provisions in lieu thereof. (Repealed by Statute Law (Repeals) Act 2013 (c. 2))
Rhymney Railway Amendment Act 1855	18 & 19 Vict. c. cx	2 July 1855
An Act to enable the Rhymney Railway Company to extend their Railway to the Taff Vale Railway, to construct Branch Railways, and for other Purposes.
Bridport Roads (First District) Act 1855	18 & 19 Vict. c. cxi	2 July 1855
An Act for continuing the Term and amending and extending the Provisions of the Act (Note: Roads to and from Bridport Act 1824 (5 Geo. 4. c. xcvii)) relating to the First District of the Bridport Turnpike Roads in the County of Dorset.
Bridport and Broadwinsor Roads Act 1855 (repealed)	18 & 19 Vict. c. cxii	2 July 1855
An Act for continuing the Term and amending and extending the Provisions of the Act (Note: Roads to Join Crewkerne Turnpike Road (Dorset and Somerset) Act 1828 (9 Geo. 4. c. xix)) relating to the Bridport and Broadwinsor Turnpike Roads. (Repealed by Annual Turnpike Acts Continuance Act 1876 (39 & 40 Vict. c. 39))
Bombay, Baroda and Central India Railway Act 1855 (repealed)	18 & 19 Vict. c. cxiii	2 July 1855
An Act for incorporating the Bombay, Baroda, and Central India Railway Company; and for other Purposes connected therewith. (Repealed by Bombay, Baroda and Central India Railway Act 1906 (6 Edw. 7. c. lix))
Bognor Railway (Extension of Time) Act 1855	18 & 19 Vict. c. cxiv	2 July 1855
An Act for extending the Time for the Purchase of Lands and for the Completion of a Railway from Chichester to Bognor.
Scinde Railway Act 1855 (repealed)	18 & 19 Vict. c. cxv	2 July 1855
An Act for incorporating the Scinde Railway Company, and for other Purposes connected therewith. (Repealed by Scinde Railway Act 1857 (20 & 21 Vict. c. clx))
North Yorkshire and Cleveland Railway Act 1855	18 & 19 Vict. c. cxvi	2 July 1855
An Act to enable the North Yorkshire and Cleveland Railway Company to make a Branch from their Railway to the Middlesbrough and Guisbrough Railway, and also a Branch to Whorlton, and other Works; and to alter and amend the Act (Note: North Yorkshire and Cleveland Railway Act 1854 (17 & 18 Vict. c. cli)) relating to the said Company; and for other Purposes.
International Life Assurance Society Act 1855	18 & 19 Vict. c. cxvii	2 July 1855
An Act to change the Name of "The National Loan Fund Life Assurance Society" to the Name of "The International Life Assurance Society;" and to enable the said Society to sue and be sued in the Name of the Chairman or Secretary or any One Director of the said Society; and to give additional Powers to the said Society.
Glasgow Corporation Waterworks Act 1855	18 & 19 Vict. c. cxviii	2 July 1855
An Act to authorize and empower the Magistrates and Council of the City of Glasgow to supply with Water the said City and Suburbs thereof, and Districts and Places adjacent; to purchase and acquire the Glasgow Waterworks, and the Gorbals Gravitation Waterworks; and to introduce an additional Supply of Water from Loch Katrine; and for other Purposes.
Ayr Harbour Act 1855	18 & 19 Vict. c. cxix	2 July 1855
An Act for maintaining and improving the Harbour of Ayr, and for the better Regulation and Management thereof.
Aberdare Valley Railway Act 1855	18 & 19 Vict. c. cxx	2 July 1855
An Act for making a Railway through Part of the Aberdare Valley in the County of Glamorgan, to join the Vale of Neath Railway.
Birmingham Canal Navigations Act 1855	18 & 19 Vict. c. cxxi	2 July 1855
An Act for enabling the Company of Proprietors of the Birmingham Canal Navigations to make and maintain additional Canals and Works, and for other Purposes.
Exeter and Exmouth Railway Act 1855 (repealed)	18 & 19 Vict. c. cxxii	2 July 1855
An Act for making Railways from the South Devon Railway to Exmouth, and to the Basin of the Exeter Canal, to be called The Exeter and Exmouth Railway. (Repealed by Exeter and Exmouth Railway Act 1858 (21 & 22 Vict. c. lvi))
Electric Telegraph Company's Consolidation Act 1855	18 & 19 Vict. c. cxxiii	2 July 1855
An Act to consolidate the Capital Stock of the Electric Telegraph Company and of the International Telegraph Company, and to grant further Powers to the Electric Telegraph Company.
Great Northern Railway Act 1855	18 & 19 Vict. c. cxxiv	2 July 1855
An Act to enable the Great Northern Railway Company further to increase their Capital; and for other Purposes with relation to the same Company.
Colonial Life Assurance Act 1855	18 & 19 Vict. c. cxxv	2 July 1855
An Act for incorporating the "Colonial Life Assurance Company;" for enabling the said Company to sue and to be sued, to take and hold Property; and for other Purposes relating to the said Company.
Hartlepool Port and Harbour Act 1855	18 & 19 Vict. c. cxxvi	16 July 1855
An Act for the Improvement, Maintenance, and Regulation of the Port of Hartlepool, for the Construction of a Harbour of Refuge there, and for other Purposes.
Fife and Kinross Railway Act 1855	18 & 19 Vict. c. cxxvii	16 July 1855
An Act for making a Railway from Ladybank on the Line of the Edinburgh, Perth, and Dundee Railway, by Auchtermuchty and Strathmiglo, to Milnathort and Kinross.
Sunderland Dock Act 1855 (repealed)	18 & 19 Vict. c. cxxviii	16 July 1855
An Act to authorize the Sunderland Dock Company to make further Works; and to amend and consolidate the Acts relating to the said Company; and for Other Purposes. (Repealed by Wear Navigation and Sunderland Dock (Consolidation and Amendment) Act 1922 (12 & 13 Geo. 5. c. lxxxiv))
Manchester, Sheffield and Lincolnshire Railway (Capital) Act 1855	18 & 19 Vict. c. cxxix	16 July 1855
An Act for regulating the Share Capital of the Manchester, Sheffield, and Lincolnshire Railway Company; and for other Purposes.
Stockport, Disley, and Whaley Bridge Railway Act 1855	18 & 19 Vict. c. cxxx	16 July 1855
An Act to enable the Stockport, Disley, and Whaley Bridge Railway Company to construct a Junction Line to the Cromford and High Peak Railway, and for other Purposes.
Carmarthen and Cardigan Railway (Deviation) Act 1855	18 & 19 Vict. c. cxxxi	16 July 1855
An Act to enable the Carmarthen and Cardigan Railway Company to make a Deviation in their Line of Railway; and for other Purposes.
Leek Improvement Act 1855	18 & 19 Vict. c. cxxxii	16 July 1855
An Act for the Improvement of the Town of Leek in the County of Stafford, for purchasing the Market Tolls, and for providing more commodious Markets and Cemeteries, and for better supplying the Inhabitants with Water; and for other Purposes.
Weymouth Waterworks Act 1855	18 & 19 Vict. c. cxxxiii	16 July 1855
An Act to enable the Weymouth Waterworks Company to increase and extend their Supply of Water, and to construct new Works, and for other Purposes.
Grand Surrey Docks and Canal Act 1855 (repealed)	18 & 19 Vict. c. cxxxiv	16 July 1855
An Act for changing the Corporate Name of the Company of Proprietors of the Grand Surrey Canal; for consolidating their Acts; for authorizing them to make a new Entrance from the Thames, additional Docks and other Works, and to raise further Moneys; and for other Purposes. (Repealed by Surrey Commercial Dock Act 1864 (27 & 28 Vict. c. xxxi))
Torquay, Tor, and St. Mary Church Gas Amendment Act 1855	18 & 19 Vict. c. cxxxv	16 July 1855
An Act for granting further Powers to the Torquay, Tor, and Saint Mary Church Gas Company.
Hendon and Hull and Wyton and Flinton Turnpike Roads Act 1855	18 & 19 Vict. c. cxxxvi	16 July 1855
An Act to repeal the Acts passed for repairing the Road from Hedon through Preston and Bilton to Hull, and other Roads in the County of York, and to make other Provisions in lieu thereof.
Sligo's Gas Company Act 1855	18 & 19 Vict. c. cxxxvii	16 July 1855
An Act for incorporating the "Gaslight Company of Sligo" and for other Purposes.
West Bromwich Improvement Amendment Act 1855 (repealed)	18 & 19 Vict. c. cxxxviii	16 July 1855
An Act to amend the Provisions of "The West Bromwich Improvement Act, 1854," (Note: West Bromwich Improvement Act 1854 (17 & 18 Vict. c. clxiii)) with relation to the Prevention of Smoke. (Repealed by West Bromwich Corporation Act 1969 (c. lix))
Staines, Wokingham and Woking Railway Amendment Act 1855	18 & 19 Vict. c. cxxxix	16 July 1855
An Act to vary the Mode of carrying the Staines, Wokingham, and Woking Railway across certain Roads, and for other Purposes.
Cape Town Railway and Dock Act 1855 (repealed)	18 & 19 Vict. c. cxl	16 July 1855
An Act for incorporating "The Cape Town Railway and Dock Company," and for other Purposes connected therewith. (Repealed by Cape Railway Act 1867 (30 & 31 Vict. c. liii))
Glasgow, Kirkintilloch and Baldernock Turnpike Road Trust Act 1855	18 & 19 Vict. c. cxli	16 July 1855
An Act to amalgamate the Glasgow and Inchbelly Bridge and Possil and Balmore Turnpike Road Trusts, and to make Branch Roads; and for other Purposes.
Ballater Turnpike Road Act 1855 (repealed)	18 & 19 Vict. c. cxlii	16 July 1855
An Act for making and maintaining a Turnpike Road from Charlestown of Aboyne, by Ballater, Crathie, and Castletown of Braemar, to Cairnwell Hill, with a Branch at Crathie, in the County o£ Aberdeen; and for other Purposes. (Repealed by Aberdeenshire Roads Act 1865 (28 & 29 Vict. c. ccxl))
Gateshead Quay Act 1855	18 & 19 Vict. c. cxliii	16 July 1855
An Act for constructing and maintaining a Quay and other Works in the Borough of Gateshead in the County of Durham, and for other Purposes.
Halifax Gas Act 1855 (repealed)	18 & 19 Vict. c. cxliv	16 July 1855
An Act to enable the Halifax Gaslight and Coke Company to transfer their Undertaking and Powers to the Halifax Local Board of Health; and for other Purposes. (Repealed by West Yorkshire Act 1980 (c. xiv))
Royal London Militia Act 1855	18 & 19 Vict. c. cxlv	16 July 1855
An Act to amend an Act of the First Year of the Reign of King George the Fourth, Chapter 100, (Note: Militia (City of London) Act 1820 (1 Geo. 4. c. 100)) to enable Her Majesty's Commissioners of Lieutenancy for the City of London to purchase certain Lands and Houses for building more convenient and requisite Head Quarters, Storehouses, and other proper Accommodation for the Royal London Militia, and to confer certain other Powers.
Luton, Dunstable and Welwyn Junction Railway Act 1855	18 & 19 Vict. c. cxlvi	16 July 1855
An Act for making a Railway from the London and Northwestern Railway at Dunstable in the County of Bedford to the Great Northern Railway at or near Welwyn in the County of Hertford, to be called the "Luton, Dunstable, and Welwyn Junction Railway;" and for other Purposes.
Folkestone Improvement Act 1855	18 & 19 Vict. c. cxlvii	16 July 1855
An Act to extend the Limits of the Borough of Folkestone; to enable the Corporation of the said Borough to construct a Market House; to make certain new Streets and other Improvements; and to pave, light, drain, and otherwise improve the said Borough; and for other Purposes.
Gun Barrel Proof Act 1855 (repealed)	18 & 19 Vict. c. cxlviii	16 July 1855
An Act for insuring the due Proof of Gun Barrels in England, and for other Purposes. (Repealed by Gun Barrel Proof Act 1868 (31 & 32 Vict. c. cxiii))
Stockton and Darlington Railway Act 1855	18 & 19 Vict. c. cxlix	16 July 1855
An Act for enabling the Stockton and Darlington Railway Company to make new Branches and other Works; to acquire additional Lands; and for other Purposes.
West Somerset Mineral Railway Act 1855 (repealed)	18 & 19 Vict. c. cl	16 July 1855
An Act for authorizing the making and maintaining of the West Somerset Mineral Railway, and the improving and regulating of the Harbour of Watchet in the County of Somerset; and for other Purposes. (Repealed by West Somerset Mineral Railway (Abandonment) Act 1923 (13 & 14 Geo. 5. c. xciv))
Wolverhampton New Waterworks Act 1855	18 & 19 Vict. c. cli	16 July 1855
An Act for better supplying with Water the Town and Parish of Wolverhampton, the Suburbs thereof, and the Parishes and Places adjacent thereto.
Bradford Corporation Waterworks Amendment Act 1855 (repealed)	18 & 19 Vict. c. clii	16 July 1855
An Act to amend "The Bradford Corporation Waterworks Act, 1854." (Note: Bradford Corporation Waterworks Act 1854 (17 & 18 Vict. c. cxxix)) (Repealed by Bradford Water Order 1968 (SI 1968/2051))
Carlisle and Silloth Bay Railway and Dock Act 1855	18 & 19 Vict. c. cliii	16 July 1855
An Act for making a Railway from the Port Carlisle Railway in the Township of Drumburgh to or near to the Coat Lighthouse in Silloth Bag in the Parish of Holme Cultram in the County of Cumberland, and also a Dock and Jetty at Silloth Bay; and for making Arrangements with the Port Carlisle Dock and Railway Company; and for other Purposes.
Keighley and Kendal Turnpike Road (Yorkshire District) Act 1855	18 & 19 Vict. c. cliv	16 July 1855
An Act for maintaining the Yorkshire District of the Road from Keighley in the West Riding of the County of York to Kirkby-in-Kendal in the County of Westmoreland.
Liverpool Improvement Act 1855 (repealed)	18 & 19 Vict. c. clv	16 July 1855
An Act for enabling the Mayor, Aldermen, and Burgesses of the Borough of Liverpool to acquire Lands; and for other Purposes. (Repealed by Liverpool Corporation Act 1921 (11 & 12 Geo. 5. c. lxxiv))
Wadhurst and West Farleigh Road Act 1855	18 & 19 Vict. c. clvi	16 July 1855
An Act to renew the Term and continue the Powers of an Act passed in the Ninth Year of the Reign of His Majesty King George the Fourth, intituled "An Act for more effectually repairing and improving the Road from Wadhurst to the Turnpike Road on Lamberhurst Down, both in the County of Sussex, and from the Turnpike Road on Pullen's Hill to West Farleigh Street, both in the County Kent." (Note: Road from Wadhurst and from Pullen's Hill Act 1828 (9 Geo. 4. c. xvii))
Waveney Valley Railway Act 1855 (repealed)	18 & 19 Vict. c. clvii	23 July 1855
An Act for extending the Times granted to purchase Lands for the Part of the Waveney Valley Railway between Bungay and Beccles. (Repealed by Great Eastern Railway (Additional Powers) Act 1863 (26 & 27 Vict. c. cxc))
Edinburgh and Glasgow Railway Amendment Act 1855	18 & 19 Vict. c. clviii	23 July 1855
An Act to enable the Edinburgh and Glasgow Railway Company to enlarge their Station at Queen Street, Glasgow; to raise additional Capital; and for other Purposes.
Great Northern London Cemetery Act 1855 (repealed)	18 & 19 Vict. c. clix	23 July 1855
An Act for making and maintaining the Great Northern London Cemetery, and for other Purposes. (Repealed by Great Northern London Cemetery Act 1976 (c. xxvii))
Wisbech Port Act 1855	18 & 19 Vict. c. clx	23 July 1855
An Act for better enabling the Mayor, Aldermen, and Burgesses of the Borough of Wisbech to raise and secure Monies payable by them to the Nene Valley Drainage and Navigation Improvement Commissioners; and for other Purposes.
Bolton and Nightingale Road Act 1855	18 & 19 Vict. c. clxi	23 July 1855
An Act to repeal the Act (Note: Bolton and Nightingale Road and other roads in Lancashire Act 1824 (5 Geo. 4. c. cv)) relating to the Bolton and Nightingale's Turnpike Road, and to make other Provisions in lieu thereof.
Dagenham (Thames) Dock Act 1855	18 & 19 Vict. c. clxii	23 July 1855
An Act to authorize the Construction of a Dock on the North Side of the River Thames, to be called "The Dagenham (Thames) Dock."
London Necropolis and National Mausoleum Amendment Act 1855	18 & 19 Vict. c. clxiii	23 July 1855
An Act to amend "The London Necropolis and National Mausoleum Act, 1852," (Note: London Necropolis and National Mausoleum Act 1852 (15 & 16 Vict. c. cxlix)) and for other Purposes.
Honiton Turnpike Roads Act 1855	18 & 19 Vict. c. clxiv	23 July 1855
An Act to repeal an Act (Note: Honiton Roads Act 1822 (3 Geo. 4. c. xcviii)) for making, widening, repairing, and maintaining certain Roads leading to and from the Town of Honiton in the County of Devon; and to make other Provisions in lieu thereof.
East of Fife Railway Act 1855	18 & 19 Vict. c. clxv	23 July 1855
An Act for making a Railway from the Leven Railway at the Town of Leven, to the Town of Kilconquhar in the County of Fife, to be called "The East of Fife Railway."
Royal Medical Benevolent College Act 1855	18 & 19 Vict. c. clxvi	23 July 1855
An Act to incorporate the Royal Medical Benevolent College, and for other Purposes.
Londonderry and Coleraine Railway Leasing Act 1855	18 & 19 Vict. c. clxvii	23 July 1855
An Act to enable the Londonderry and Coleraine Railway Company to lease a Portion of their Undertaking; and for other Purposes.
Cavendish Bridge and Hulland Ward Roads Act 1855	18 & 19 Vict. c. clxviii	23 July 1855
An Act for more effectually repairing the Cavendish Bridge and Brassington Road, and for making a Branch Line of Road in connexion with the same, all in the County of Derby.
Mid Kent Railway Act 1855	18 & 19 Vict. c. clxix	23 July 1855
An Act for making Railways from the Farnborough Extension of the West London and Crystal Palace Railway to the North Kent Line of the South-eastern Railway, and to the London, Brighton, and South Coast Railway, with Branches therefrom; and for other Purposes.
Barrow Harbour Amendment Act 1855 (repealed)	18 & 19 Vict. c. clxx	23 July 1855
An Act for extending the Limits of the Harbour of Barrow in the County Palatine of Lancaster; and to enable the Commissioners of the said Harbour to raise a further Sum of Money; and for other Purposes. (Repealed by Furness Railway and Barrow Harbour Act 1863 (26 & 27 Vict. c. lxxxix))
Birkenhead Docks Act 1855 (repealed)	18 & 19 Vict. c. clxxi	23 July 1855
An Act for vesting the Undertakings of the Birkenhead Dock Company, and of the Trustees of the Birkenhead Docks in the Mayor, Aldermen, and Burgesses of the Borough of Liverpool, and for other Purposes. (Repealed by Mersey Docks and Harbour Board Act 1971 (c. x))
Improved Postal and Passenger Communication between England and Ireland Act 1855 or the Improved Postal and Passenger Service between England and Ireland Act 1855	18 & 19 Vict. c. clxxii	23 July 1855
An Act for improving the Postal and Passenger Communication between England and Ireland, and for authorizing Arrangements between certain Companies in England and Ireland in relation thereto; and for other Purposes.
Furness Railway Act 1855	18 & 19 Vict. c. clxxiii	23 July 1855
An Act to repeal and consolidate the several Acts relating to the Furness Railway Company; to enable the said Company to raise a further Sum of Money; to give further Powers to the said Company; and for other Purposes.
Liverpool Dock Act 1855 (repealed)	18 & 19 Vict. c. clxxiv	23 July 1855
An Act to authorize the Trustees of the Liverpool Docks to construct new Works, and to raise a further Sum of Money; and for other Purposes. (Repealed by Mersey Dock Acts Consolidation Act 1858 (21 & 22 Vict. c. xcii))
South Staffordshire Railway Act 1855	18 & 19 Vict. c. clxxv	23 July 1855
An Act for enabling the South Staffordshire Railway Company to make certain Branch Railways; for the Purchase of additional Lands at Wichnor and Dudley; and for other Purposes.
Gateshead and Hexham Turnpike Roads Act 1855 (repealed)	18 & 19 Vict. c. clxxvi	23 July 1855
An Act for maintaining and improving the Road from Gateshead in the County of Durham to the Hexham Turnpike Road near Dilston Bar in the County of Northumberland, and other Roads connected therewith. (Repealed by Annual Turnpike Acts Continuance Act 1871 (34 & 35 Vict. c. 115))
Portsmouth Railway Amendment Act 1855	18 & 19 Vict. c. clxxvii	23 July 1855
An Act to enable the Portsmouth Railway Company to make an Alteration in the Line of their Railway; and for other Purposes.
Shrewsbury Improvement Act 1855	18 & 19 Vict. c. clxxviii	23 July 1855
An Act for the Improvement of the Borough of Shrewsbury in the County of Salop.
Hereford Improvement Act 1854 (Correction of Oversight) Act 1855 (repealed)	18 & 19 Vict. c. clxxix	30 July 1855
An Act to correct an Oversight in "The Hereford Improvement Act, 1854." (Note: Hereford Improvement Act 1854 (17 & 18 Vict. c. xxxi)) (Repealed by Statute Law (Repeals) Act 1998 (c. 43))
Dearness Valley Railway Act 1855	18 & 19 Vict. c. clxxx	30 July 1855
An Act to incorporate a Company for making a Railway from the Bishop Auckland Branch of the North-eastern Railway in the Township of Elvet to the Township of Brandon and Byshottles all in the County of Durham, to be called "The Dearness Valley Railway;" and for other Purposes.
Oxford, Worcester and Wolverhampton Railway (Improvements and Branches) Act 1855	18 & 19 Vict. c. clxxxi	30 July 1855
An Act to enable the Oxford, Worcester, and Wolverhampton Railway Company to alter and improve certain of their Works, and to construct additional Works; and to authorize Arrangements with respect to the Stratford-upon-Avon Canal; and for other Purposes.
Somerset Central Railway Act 1855	18 & 19 Vict. c. clxxxii	30 July 1855
An Act for enabling the Somerset Central Railway Company to construct Railways to Wells and to Burnham, and a Pier at Burnham, and to raise additional Capital; and for other Purposes.
Severn Valley Railway Act 1855	18 & 19 Vict. c. clxxxiii	30 July 1855
An Act for the making and maintaining of the Severn Valley Railway; and for other Purposes.
Torquay Churches Act 1855	18 & 19 Vict. c. clxxxiv	30 July 1855
An Act to facilitate the Erection of One or more Churches in the Parishes of Tormoham and Saint Mary Church, at or near the Town of Torquay, in the County of Devon; and for other Purposes.
Airdrie Rural District Police and Airdrie District Courthouses Act 1855 (repealed)	18 & 19 Vict. c. clxxxv	30 July 1855
An Act to repeal the Act of the Ninth Victoria, Chapter Thirty-two, (Note: Old and New Monkland, Bothwell and Shotts Police District Act 1846 (9 & 10 Vict. c. xxxii)) to reconstitute and extend the Police District therein mentioned under the Name of the Airdrie Rural Police District, and to erect and maintain a Hall, Court House, and Public Offices for the Airdrie District of Lanarkshire. (Repealed by Airdrie District Court House Commissioners (Dissolution) Order Confirmation Act 1968 (c. i))
Surrey Consumers Gas Company (Purchase of Deptford Gasworks) Act 1855	18 & 19 Vict. c. clxxxvi	30 July 1855
An Act to authorize the Transfer of the Undertaking of the Deptford Gaslight and Coke Company to the Surrey Consumers Gas Company, and to wind up the Affairs of the first-named Company; and for other Purposes.
East Kent Railway (Extension to Dover) Act 1855	18 & 19 Vict. c. clxxxvii	30 July 1855
An Act for Enabling the East Kent Railway Company to extend their authorized Line of Railway by the Construction of a Railway from Canterbury to Dover, with Two Branches at Dover; to increase their Capital; and for other Purposes.
South Western Railway Capital and Works Act 1855	18 & 19 Vict. c. clxxxviii	14 August 1855
An Act for Amending the Acts relating to the London and South-western Railway Company; for regulating their Capital; and for other Purposes.
Dundalk Harbour and Port Act 1855	18 & 19 Vict. c. clxxxix	14 August 1855
An Act for the Conservancy and Improvement of Dundalk Harbour and Port, and for other Purposes.
Glasgow, Dumbarton and Helensburgh Railway Act 1855	18 & 19 Vict. c. cxc	14 August 1855
An Act for making certain Railways to connect Glasgow, Dumbarton, and Helensburgh, in the Counties of Lanark and Dumbarton; and for making Provision for the Use and working of the said Railways.
Great Western and Brentford Railway Act 1855	18 & 19 Vict. c. cxci	14 August 1855
An Act for making a Railway from the Great Western Railway at Southall in the County of Middlesex to Brentford in the same County, with Docks at the last-mentioned Place; and for other Purposes.
Stokes Bay Railway and Pier Act 1855	18 & 19 Vict. c. cxcii	14 August 1855
An Act for making a Railway and Pier to and at Stokes Bay in the County of Hants.
Westminster Improvement Act 1855	18 & 19 Vict. c. cxciii	14 August 1855
An Act for extending the Times granted to the Westminster Improvement Commissioners by "The Westminster Improvement Act, 1845," (Note: Westminster Improvement Act 1845 (8 & 9 Vict. c. clxxviii)) "The Westminster Improvement Act, 1847," (Note: Westminster Improvement Act 1847 (10 & 11 Vict. c. cxxxi)) "The Westminster Improvement Act, 1850," (Note: Westminster Improvement Act 1850 (13 & 14 Vict. c. cii)) and "The Westminster Improvement Act, 1853," (Note: Westminster Improvement Act 1853 (16 & 17 Vict. c. clxxvi)) for the compulsory Purchase of Lands and the Completion of Works; and for altering the Corporate Name of "The Westminster Association for improving the Dwellings of the Working Classes" to "The London and Westminster Association for improving the Dwellings of the Working Classes;" and for other Purposes.
Cannock Mineral Railway Act 1855	18 & 19 Vict. c. cxciv	14 August 1855
An Act to change the corporate Name of the Derbyshire, Staffordshire, and Worcestershire Junction Railway Company, to repeal their Act (Note: Derbyshire, Staffordshire, and Worcestershire Junction Railway Act 1847 (10 & 11 Vict. c. cx)) and consolidate their Powers, to alter and define their Undertaking, to reduce their Capital; and for other Purposes.
Westminster Land Company Act 1855	18 & 19 Vict. c. cxcv	14 August 1855
An Act for facilitating the Completion of the Westminster Improvements, and for the Incorporation of the Westminster Land Company for a limited Period for that Purpose.
River Lee Water Act 1855	18 & 19 Vict. c. cxcvi	14 August 1855
An Act for transferring Part of the Property and Powers of the Trustees of the River Lee; and for the Amendment of the Acts of the New River Company, the East London Waterworks Company, and the said Trustees; and for other Purposes.
Royal Conical Flour Mill Company's Amendment Act 1855	18 & 19 Vict. c. cxcvii	14 August 1855
An Act to repeal, alter, and amend some of the Provisions of "The Royal Conical Flour Mill Company's Act, 1854;" (Note: Royal Conical Flour Mill Company's Act 1854 (17 & 18 Vict. c. cxc)) to enable the Company to raise a further Sum of Money; and for other Purposes.
Westminster Terminus Railway Extension (Clapham to Norwood) Act 1855 (repealed)	18 & 19 Vict. c. cxcviii	14 August 1855
An Act for making a Railway from the Manor Street Terminus of the authorized Westminster Terminus Railway in the Parish of Clapham in the County of Surrey to Norwood in the Parish of St. Mary Lambeth in the same County, connecting the Westminster Terminus Railway with the West End of London and Crystal Palace Railway. (Repealed by Statute Law (Repeals) Act 2013 (c. 2))

=== Private acts ===
Short title	Citation	Royal assent
Long title
Matthew Hill's Estate Act 1855	18 & 19 Vict. c. 1 Pr.	15 June 1855
An Act for enabling Leases to be made of the Freehold Estates of the late Matthew Hill Esquire, and for other Purposes.
Hoffe's Estate Act 1855	18 & 19 Vict. c. 2 Pr.	26 June 1855
An Act to enable the Trustees under the Settlement executed on the Marriage of Phllip Rideout Hoffe to effect a Sale to Sir Richard Plumptre Glyn Baronet, of certain Hereditaments situate at Twyford in the Parish of Campion Abbas and County of Dorset, and for other Purposes; and of which the Short Title is "Hoffe's Estate Act, 1865."
Livesey's Estate Act 1855	18 & 19 Vict. c. 3 Pr.	23 July 1855
An Act for authorizing the granting of Mining Leases of Estates subject to the Uses of the Will of Robert Bell Livesey Esquire, deceased, and for other Purposes.
Hammond's Estate Act 1855	18 & 19 Vict. c. 4 Pr.	23 July 1855
An Act for enabling Leases, Sales, Repairs, and Improvements to be made of the Estates of James Walthall Hammond Esquire, deceased, and for other Purposes, the Short Title of which is "Hammonds Estate Act, 1856."
Livesey's Blackburn Estate Act 1855	18 & 19 Vict. c. 5 Pr.	23 July 1855
An Act to authorize Conveyances in Fee or Demises for long Terms of Years, under reserved Rents, of certain Parts of Estates, settled by the Will of the late Joseph Livesey Esquire, deceased.
Cromarty Estate Act 1855	18 & 19 Vict. c. 6 Pr.	23 July 1855
An Act to enable George William Holmes Ross, of Cromarty, Esquire, to relieve the Estate of Cromarty from Burdens affecting the same, to charge the said Estate with certain Family Provisions and with certain Sums of Money expended in Improvements thereon.
Bray's Estate Act 1855	18 & 19 Vict. c. 7 Pr.	30 July 1855
An Act for authorizing Mining and other Leases and Sales and Exchanges to be made of the Lands devised by the Will of George Bray deceased; and for other Purposes.
Jenkins' Estate Act 1855	18 & 19 Vict. c. 8 Pr.	30 July 1855
An Act for authorizing the granting of Building Leases of certain Parts of the Estates subject to the Residuary Devise in the Will of John Jenkins, late of Saltley Hall in the County of Warwick, Esquire, and for appointing new Trustees of the said Will; and for other Purposes.
Earl of Abergavenny's Leasing Act 1855	18 & 19 Vict. c. 9 Pr.	30 July 1855
An Act for enabling the Right Honourable William Nevill Earl of Abergavenny to grant Leases of entailed Mines, Minerals, Lands, and Hereditaments in the County of Monmouth.
Saint John Baptist College, Oxford Act 1855	18 & 19 Vict. c. 10 Pr.	14 August 1855
An Act to enable the President and Scholars of Saint John Baptist College in the University of Oxford to grant Building Leases of their Lands in the Parishes of Saint Giles, Saint Thomas, and Woolvercot, Oxford; and for other Purposes.
Metropolis Roads (Harvist's Estate) Act 1855	18 & 19 Vict. c. 11 Pr.	14 August 1855
An Act for vesting in the Commissioners of the Metropolis Turnpike Roads North of the Thames the Lands in Islington devised by the Will of Edward Harvist to the Brewers Company, upon trust for the Repair of the Highway from Tyburn to Edgeworth; and for discharging the Company from the Trusts of that Will; and for enabling the Commissioners to grant Building Leases of those Lands; and for other Purposes.
Merton College Act 1855	18 & 19 Vict. c. 12 Pr.	14 August 1855
An Act to empower the Warden and Scholars of the House or College of Scholars of Merton in the University of Oxford to sell certain Lands situate in the Parish of Holywell otherwise Saint Cross in the City of Oxford, and to lay out the Monies to arise from such Sale in the Purchase of other Hereditaments.
Handcock's Estate Act 1855	18 & 19 Vict. c. 13 Pr.	14 August 1855
An Act for giving Effect to a Compromise of certain Suits and Claims affecting the Estates of Josephine Catherine Handcock, Anne Mary Handcock, and Honoria Handcock, Spinsters, deceased, and for vesting the said Estates in John Stratford Handcock Esquire, subject to certain Charges; and for other purposes.
Lord Clermont's Estate Act 1855	18 & 19 Vict. c. 14 Pr.	14 August 1855
An Act to authorize the granting of Building and other Leases of Estates in the Counties of Louth and Armagh, devised by the Will of the Right Honourable William Charles Viscount Clermont deceased, and the Sale and Exchange of certain Portions of the Estate so devised; and for other Purposes.
Marshall's Charity Act 1855	18 & 19 Vict. c. 15 Pr.	14 August 1855
An Act for the future Government, Management, and Regulation of the Charity of John Marshall, late of Southwark in the County of Surrey, Gentleman, deceased; and for other Purposes.
Halford's Estate Act 1855	18 & 19 Vict. c. 16 Pr.	14 August 1855
An Act for vesting the Freehold and Leasehold Estates comprised in the residuary Gifts in the Will of Joseph Halford Esquire, deceased, in Trustees, with Powers to sell, exchange, and lease the same, and to purchase other Lands, to be resettled conformably to such residuary Gifts.
Carnegie's Restitution Act 1855 (Note: This act was not printed by the Queen's Printer.)	18 & 19 Vict. c. 17 Pr.	2 July 1855
An Act to relieve Sir James Carnegie of Southesk, Kinnaird, and Pittarrow, Baronet, from the Effect of the Attainder of James Fifth Earl of Southesk and Baron Carnegie of Kinnaird and Leuchars in Scotland.
Pedder's Divorce Act 1855	18 & 19 Vict. c. 18 Pr.	23 July 1855
An Act to dissolve the Marriage of Henry Newsham Pedder with Emma Pedder his now Wife, and to enable him to marry again; and for other Purposes.
Ewing's Divorce Act 1855	18 & 19 Vict. c. 19 Pr.	14 August 1855
An Act to dissolve the Marriage of William Ewing the younger with Helen Mary Ewing his now Wife, and to enable him to marry again; and for other Purposes.
Wyndham's Divorce Act 1855	18 & 19 Vict. c. 20 Pr.	14 August 1855
An Act to dissolve the Marriage of Arthur Wyndham Esquire with Ann Magdalene Louisa Wyndham his now Wife, and to enable him to marry again; and for other Purposes.
Hadow's Divorce Act 1855	18 & 19 Vict. c. 21 Pr.	14 August 1855
An Act to dissolve the Marriage oi James Remington Hadow Merchant with Jane Menzies his now Wife, and to enable him to marry again; and for other Purposes.
Jones's Divorce Act 1855	18 & 19 Vict. c. 22 Pr.	14 August 1855
An Act to dissolve the Marriage of Edward Jones with Elizabeth Jones his now Wife, and to enable him to marry again; and for other Purposes.
Sumner's Divorce Act 1855	18 & 19 Vict. c. 23 Pr.	14 August 1855
An Act to dissolve the Marriage of Morton Cornish Sumner Esquire with Penelope Rubina Maria his now Wife, and to enable the said Morton Cornish Sumner to marry again; and for other Purposes therein mentioned.

=== Sources ===
- The Statutes of the United Kingdom of Great Britain and Ireland, 18 & 19 Victoria. 1854–5. 1807 – via Internet Archive.
- The Statutes of the United Kingdom of Great Britain and Ireland, 18 & 19 Victoria. 1854–5. 1855 – via Internet Archive.
- A Collection of the Public General Statutes, passed in the Eighteenth and Nineteenth Years of the Reign of Her Majesty Queen Victoria, 1854–55. London: Eyre & Spottiswoode. 1855 – via Internet Archive.
- Journal of the House of Commons. Vol. 110. London: His Majesty's Stationery Office. pp. 3–471.
- Chronological Table of and Index to the Statutes. Vol. 1: To the End of the Session 59 Vict. Sess. 2 (1895) (13th ed.). London: Her Majesty's Stationery Office. 1896. pp. 371–376 – via Google Books.

== See also ==
- List of acts of the Parliament of the United Kingdom
