= Commissioners for Oaths Act 1889 =

Act of the Parliament of the United Kingdom

Commissioners for Oaths Act 1889 (Note: Section 15.)
- Act of Parliament
- Parliament of the United Kingdom
- Long title: An Act for amending and consolidating enactments relating to the administration of Oaths.
- Citation: 52 & 53 Vict. c. 10
- Territorial extent: United Kingdom

Dates
- Royal assent: 31 May 1889
- Commencement: 1 January 1890 (Note: Section 14.)
Other legislation
Amends	See § Repealed enactments
Repeals/revokes	See § Repealed enactments
Amended by	Commissioners for Oaths Act 1891; Statute Law Revision Act 1908; Perjury Act 1911; Forgery Act 1913; False Oaths (Scotland) Act 1933; Evidence and Powers of Attorney Act 1943; Oaths And Evidence (Overseas Authorities And Countries) Act 1963; Consular Relations Act 1968; Courts Act 1971; Solicitors Act 1974; Criminal Procedure (Scotland) Act 1975; Statute Law (Repeals) Act 1977; Administration of Justice Act 1985; Courts and Legal Services Act 1990; Secretary of State for Constitutional Affairs Order 2003; Constitutional Reform Act 2005; Legal Services Act 2007

Status: Amended

Text of statute as originally enacted

Revised text of statute as amended

Text of the Commissioners for Oaths Act 1889 as in force today (including any amendments) within the United Kingdom, from legislation.gov.uk.

The Commissioners for Oaths Act 1889 (52 & 53 Vict. c. 10) is an act of the Parliament of the United Kingdom that consolidated enactments relating to the administration of oaths in the United Kingdom.

The act established the framework for the appointment and regulation of Commissioners for Oaths in the United Kingdom .

As of 2026, the act remains in force in the United Kingdom.

== Provisions ==
Section 12 of the act repealed ? enactments, listed in the schedule to the act.

Citation	Short title	Description	Extent of repeal
16 & 17 Cha. 2. c. 9	Lancaster (Affidavits) Act 1664	An Act to empower the Chancellor of the duchy to grant commissions for taking affidavits within the duchy liberty.	The whole act.
17 Geo. 2. c. 7	Affidavits in County of Lancaster Act 1743	An Act for taking and swearing affidavits to be made use of in any of the courts of the county palatine of Lancaster.	The whole act.
4 Geo. 3. c. 21	Affidavits in County of Durham Act 1763	An Act for taking and swearing affidavits to be made use of in any of the courts of the county palatine of Durham.	The whole act.
6 Geo. 4. c. 87	Consular Advances Act 1825	An Act to regulate the payment of salaries and allowances to British consuls at foreign ports, and the disbursements at such ports for certain public purposes.	Section twenty.
3 & 4 Will. 4. c. 42	Civil Procedure Act 1833	An Act for the further amendment of the law and the better advancement of justice.	Section forty-two.
4 & 5 Will. 4. c. 42	Stannaries Court of Cornwall Act 1834	An Act to facilitate the taking of affidavits and affirmations in the court of the Vice Warden of the Stannaries of Cornwall.	The whole act.
2 & 3 Vict. c. 58	Stannaries Act 1839	An Act to make further provision for the administration of justice and for improving the practice and proceedings in the courts of the Stannaries of Cornwall.	Section six from " and that any " commissioner."
5 & 6 Vict. c. 103.	Court of Chancery Act 1842	An Act for abolishing certain offices of the High Court of Chancery in England.	Sections seven and eight.
6 & 7 Vict. c. 82	Evidence by Commission Act 1843	An Act the title of which begins with the words " An Act for extending," and ends with the words " examination of witnesses."	Sections one to four.
11 & 12 Vict. c. 10	Court of Chancery Act 1848	An Act for empowering certain officers of the High Court of Chancery to administer oaths and take declarations and affirmations.	The whole act.
15 & 16 Vict. c. 76	Common Law Procedure Act 1852	The Common Law Procedure Act, 1852	Section twenty-three.
15 & 16 Vict. c. 86	Court of Chancery Procedure Act 1852	An Act to amend the practice and course of proceeding in the High Court of Chancery.	Sections twenty-two, twenty-three, and twenty-four. (Note: This had the effect of repealing the remaining residue of the act.)
16 & 17 Vict. c. 70	Lunacy Regulation Act 1853	The Lunacy Regulation Act, 1853.	Section fifty-seven.
16 & 17 Vict. c. 78	Commissioners for Oaths Act 1853	An Act relating to the appointment of persons to administer oaths in Chancery, and to affidavits made for purposes connected with registration.	The whole act.
17 & 18 Vict. c. 78	Admiralty Court Act 1854	The Admiralty Court Act, 1854	Section six from " and any examiner " to the end of the section. Sections seven to eleven.
18 & 19 Vict. c. 42.	Commissioners for Oaths Act 1855	An Act to enable British diplomatic and consular agents abroad to administer oaths and do notarial acts.	The whole act.
18 & 19 Vict. c. 134	Court of Chancery Act 1855	An Act the title of which begins with the words " An Act to make " further provision," and ends with the words "leasing and " sale thereof."	Section fifteen.
20 & 21 Vict. c. 77	Court of Probate Act 1857	An Act to amend the law relating to probates and letters of administration in England.	Section twenty-seven to " Provided that" and from " and any person who" to end of section.
21 & 22 Vict. c. 95	Court of Probate Act 1857	An Act to amend the Act of the twentieth and twenty-first Victoria, chapter seventy-seven.	Sections thirty to thirty-four,
21 & 22 Vict. c. 108	Matrimonial Causes Act 1858	An Act to amend the Act of the twentieth and twenty-first Victoria, chapter eighty-five.	Sections twenty to twenty-three.
22 Vict. c. 16	Commissioners for Oaths, Bail in Error, etc. Act 1859	An Act the title of which begins with the words " An Act to enable," and ends with the words " of the Exchequer."	The whole act except section five.
28 & 29 Vict. c. 104	Crown Suits, &c. Act 1865	The Crown Suits, &c. Act, 1865	Sections eighteen, nineteen, forty-three, and forty-four.
32 & 33 Vict. c. 38	Bails Act 1869	The Bails Act, 1869	The whole act.
40 & 41 Vict. c. 25	Solicitors Act 1877	The Solicitors Act, 1877	Section eighteen.

== Subsequent developments ==
Section 13 of the act was repealed by section 1(1) of, and part XIV of schedule 1 to, the Statute Law (Repeals) Act 1977, which came into force on 16 June 1977.
