= Statute Law Revision (Substituted Enactments) Act 1876 =

Act of the Parliament of the United Kingdom

Statute Law Revision (Substituted Enactments) Act 1876 (Note: Section 8.)
- Act of Parliament
- Parliament of the United Kingdom
- Long title: An Act to facilitate the Revision of the Statute Law by substituting in certain Acts, incorporating Enactments which have been otherwise repealed, a reference to recent Enactments still in force.
- Citation: 39 & 40 Vict. c. 20
- Introduced by: Hugh Cairns, 1st Baron Cairns (Lords)
- Territorial extent: United Kingdom

Dates
- Royal assent: 27 June 1876
- Commencement: 27 June 1876 (Note: The Acts of Parliament (Commencement) Act 1793.)
- Repealed: 5 November 1993
Other legislation
Amends	Inclosure Act 1848; Inclosure Act 1849; Portuguese Deserters Act 1849; Inclosure Act 1852; Criminal Justice Act 1855; Municipal Corporation Mortgages, &c. Act 1860; Larceny Act 1861; Prevention of Crimes Act 1871
Amended by	Municipal Corporations Act 1882; Statute Law Revision Act 1883; Statute Law Revision Act 1898; Larceny Act 1916; Justices of the Peace Act 1949; Statute Law Revision Act 1950; Theft Act 1968; Criminal Injuries to Persons (Compensation) Act (Northern Ireland) 1968; Statute Law (Repeals) Act 1971
Repealed by	Statute Law (Repeals) Act 1993
Relates to	Repeal of Obsolete Statutes Act 1856; See Statute Law Revision Act

Status: Repealed

History of passage through Parliament

Records of Parliamentary debate relating to the statute from Hansard

Text of statute as originally enacted

Revised text of statute as amended

The Statute Law Revision (Substituted Enactments) Act 1876 (39 & 40 Vict. c. 20) was an act of the Parliament of the United Kingdom that substituted references of repealed enactments in various acts with references to non repealed enactments.

== Background ==
In the United Kingdom, acts of Parliament remain in force until expressly repealed. Blackstone's Commentaries on the Laws of England, published in the late 18th-century, raised questions about the system and structure of the common law and the poor drafting and disorder of the existing statute book.

From 1810 to 1825, the The Statutes of the Realm was published, providing the first authoritative collection of acts. The first statute law revision act was not passed until 1856 with the Repeal of Obsolete Statutes Act 1856 (19 & 20 Vict. c. 64). This approach — focusing on removing obsolete laws from the statute book followed by consolidation — was proposed by Peter Locke King MP, who had been highly critical of previous commissions' approaches, expenditures, and lack of results.

Previous statute law revision acts
Year passed	Title	Citation	Effect
1861	Statute Law Revision Act 1861	24 & 25 Vict. c. 101	Repealed or amended over 800 enactments
1863	Statute Law Revision Act 1863	26 & 27 Vict. c. 125	Repealed or amended over 1,600 enactments for England and Wales
1867	Statute Law Revision Act 1867	30 & 31 Vict. c. 59	Repealed or amended over 1,380 enactments
1870	Statute Law Revision Act 1870	33 & 34 Vict. c. 69	Repealed or amended over 250 enactments
1871	Promissory Oaths Act 1871	34 & 35 Vict. c. 48	Repealed or amended almost 200 enactments
1871	Statute Law Revision Act 1871	34 & 35 Vict. c. 116	Repealed or amended over 1,060 enactments
1872	Statute Law Revision Act 1872	35 & 36 Vict. c. 63	Repealed or amended almost 490 enactments
1872	Statute Law (Ireland) Revision Act 1872	35 & 36 Vict. c. 98	Repealed or amended over 1,050 enactments
1872	Statute Law Revision Act 1872 (No. 2)	35 & 36 Vict. c. 97	Repealed or amended almost 260 enactments
1873	Statute Law Revision Act 1873	36 & 37 Vict. c. 91	Repealed or amended 1,225 enactments
1874	Statute Law Revision Act 1874	37 & 38 Vict. c. 35	Repealed or amended over 490 enactments
1874	Statute Law Revision Act 1874 (No. 2)	37 & 38 Vict. c. 96	Repealed or amended almost 470 enactments
1875	Statute Law Revision Act 1875	38 & 39 Vict. c. 66	Repealed or amended over 1,400 enactments

== Passage ==
The bill had its first reading in the House of Lords on 11 May 1876, presented by the Lord Chancellor, Hugh Cairns, 1st Baron Cairns. The bill had its second reading in the House of Lords on 15 May 1876 and was committed to a committee of the whole house, which met on 22 May 1876 and reported on 23 May 1876, with amendments. The amended Bill had its third reading in the House of Lords on 16 May 1876 and passed, without amendments.

The bill had its first reading in the House of Commons on 2 June 1876. The bill had its second reading in the House of Commons on 15 June 1876 and was committed to a committee of the whole house, which met and reported on 16 June 1876, without amendments. The bill had its third reading in the House of Commons on 19 June 1876 and passed, without amendments.

The bill was granted royal assent on 27 June 1876.

== Provisions ==
=== Section 1 ===
Section 1 of the act substituted the Summary Jurisdiction Act 1857 (20 & 21 Vict. c. 43) for the repealed act Malicious Injuries to Property (England) Act 1827 (7 & 8 Geo. 4). c. 30 in certain sections of the inclosure acts, including:

- Inclosure Act 1848 (11 & 12 Vict. c. 99): section 10.
- Inclosure Act 1849 (12 & 13 Vict. c. 7): section 10.
- Inclosure Act 1852 (15 & 16 Vict. c. 79): section 33.

Immediately before its repeal, this section read:

... Any offence under section ten of the Inclosure Act 1848 (Note: 11 & 12 Vict. c. 99) and under section ten of the Inclosure Act 1849 (Note: 12 & 13 Vict. c. 7) and under section thirty-three of the Inclosure Act 1852 (Note: 15 & 16 Vict. c. 79) shall be deemed to be an offence punishable on summary conviction under the Summary Jurisdiction ... Acts ... : Provided ... that any information in relation to any such offence as is mentioned in this section shall be heard, tried, determined, and adjudged before two justices.

=== Section 2 ===
Section 2 of the act repealed part of section 2 of the Portuguese Deserters Act 1849 (12 & 13 Vict. c. 25), providing that the penalty for the offence shall be "recovered, paid, and applied in the same manner as a penalty for harbouring or secreting any seaman deserting from a British ship is for the time being recoverable, payable, and applicable".

=== Section 3 ===
Section 3 of the act repealed part of section 7 of the Municipal Corporation Mortgages, &c. Act 1860 (23 & 24 Vict. c. 16) as provides for misdemeanours under the repealed Punishment of Frauds Act 1857 (20 & 21 Vict. c. 54), substituting the punishment with section 75 the Larceny Act 1861 (24 & 25 Vict. c. 96).

=== Section 4 ===
Section 4 of the act repealed part of section 23 of the Criminal Justice Act 1855 (18 & 19 Vict. c. 126) as provides for the definition of "property" by reference to the repealed Larceny Act 1827 (7 & 8 Geo. 4), substituting it with the definition of "property" in the Larceny Act 1861 (24 & 25 Vict. c. 96).

=== Section 5 ===
Section 5 of the act repealed part of section 10 of the Prevention of Crimes Act 1871 (34 & 35 Vict. c. 112) as provides "any person convicted under that section shall have a right to appeal against such conviction in the manner in all respects as if the said conviction had been for an offence committed against" the partly repealed Alehouse Act 1828 (9 Geo. 4), substituting the right of appeal with "the same manner in all respects as a person who feels aggrieved by a conviction made by a court of summary jurisdiction under" the Licensing Act 1872 (35 & 36 Vict. c. 94).

Section 6 of the act provided that nothing in the act affects:

1. "Anything done or suffered."
2. "Any penalty, forfeiture or punishment incurred or to be incurred in respect of any offence repealed."
3. "Institution of any investigation or legal proceeding for enforcing or recovering any such penalty, forfeiture, or punishment as aforesaid, and such investigation or legal proceeding may be carried on as if this Act has not passed".

Section 7 of the act provided that the acts cited in the body of the act were defined in the schedule to the act.

Section 8 of the act provided that the act may be cited as "The Statute Law Revision (Substituted Enactments) Act, 1876".

== Subsequent developments ==
Section 6 was repealed by section 1 of, and the schedule to, the Statute Law Revision Act 1878 (46 & 47 Vict. c. 39), which came into force on 25 August 1883.

The words at the beginning of section 1 of the act were repealed by section 1 of, and the schedule to, the Statute Law Revision Act 1878 (46 & 47 Vict. c. 39), which came into force on 25 August 1883.

The words in the second and third places of section 1, the first paragraph of section 2, the first paragraph of section 4, the first paragraph of section 5 and section 7 of, and the schedule to, the act were repealed by section 1 of, and the first schedule to, the Statute Law Revision Act 1894 (57 & 58 Vict. c. 54), which came into force on 25 August 1894.

Section 3 of the act was repealed for England and Wales by section 48(1) of, and the schedule to, the Larceny Act 1916 (6 & 7 Geo. 5. c. 50), which came into force on 1 January 1917.

The words in the last place of section 1 of the act were repealed by section 46(2) of, and part III of schedule 7 to, the Justices of the Peace Act 1949 (12, 13 & 14 Geo. 6. c. 101).

Section 2 of the act was repealed by section 1(1) of, and the first schedule to, the Statute Law Revision Act 1950 (14 Geo. 6. c. 6), which came into force on 23 May 1950.

The act was repealed for Northern Ireland by section 13 of, and Schedule 2 to, the Criminal Injuries to Persons (Compensation) Act (Northern Ireland) 1968 (c 9) (NI).

Section 4 of the act was repealed by section 33(3) of, and part II of schedule 3 to, the Theft Act 1968, which came into force on 1 January 1969.

Section 5 of the act was repealed by section 1 of, and the part IX of the schedule to, the Statute Law (Repeals) Act 1971, which came into force on 27 July 1971.

The whole act was repealed by section 1(1) of, and part IV of schedule 1 to, the Statute Law (Repeals) Act 1993, which came into force on 5 November 1993.

The act was retained for the Republic of Ireland by section 2(2)(a) of, and part 4 of schedule 1 to, the Statute Law Revision Act 2007, which came into force on 8 May 2007.

== See also ==
- Statute Law Revision Act
