= Criminal Justice Act 1855 =

Act of the Parliament of the United Kingdom

Criminal Justice Act 1855 (Note: The citation of this act by this short title was authorised by section 1 of, and the first schedule to, the Short Titles Act 1896. Due to the repeal of those provisions it is now authorised by section 19(2) of the Interpretation Act 1978.)
- Act of Parliament
- Parliament of the United Kingdom
- Long title: An Act for diminishing Expense and Delay in the Administration of Criminal Justice in certain Cases.
- Citation: 18 & 19 Vict. c. 126
- Territorial extent: England and Wales; Ireland; (Note: Section 24.)

Dates
- Royal assent: 14 August 1855
- Commencement: 14 August 1855 (Note: The Acts of Parliament (Commencement) Act 1793.)
- Repealed: England and Wales: 1 January 1969; Northern Ireland: 1 March 1969 (Note: The Criminal Injuries to Persons (Compensation) Act 1968 (Date of Commencement) Order (Northern Ireland) 1969.)
Other legislation
Amends	See § Repealed enactments
Repeals/revokes	See § Repealed enactments
Amended by	Criminal Justice Act 1856; Larceny Act 1868
Repealed by	Metropolitan Police Magistrates Act 1875; Statute Law Revision (Substituted Enactments) Act 1876; Summary Jurisdiction Act 1879; Supreme Court of Judicature (Officers) Act 1879; Statute Law Revision Act 1892; Theft Act 1968; Costs in Criminal Cases Act (Northern Ireland) 1968; Criminal Injuries to Persons (Compensation) Act 1968

Status: Repealed

Text of statute as originally enacted

The Criminal Justice Act 1855 (18 & 19 Vict. c. 126) was an act of the Parliament of the United Kingdom. The act extended summary jurisdiction to cover what had formerly been indictable criminal offences.

== Provisions ==
=== Repealed enactments ===
Section 11 of the act repealed the 12 Ric. 2. c. 10 and Justice of the Peace Act 1390 (14 Ric. 2. c. 12) "or of any other Act now in force as directs or authorizes the Payment of Wages to Justices of the Peace and their Clerks for the Time of their Sessions".

== Subsequent developments ==
Section 19 of the act was repealed by section 2 of, and the schedule to, the Metropolitan Police Magistrates Act 1875 (38 & 39 Vict. c. 3), which came into force on 19 March 1875.

Section 23 of the act as provides for the definition of "property" by reference to the repealed Larceny Act 1827 (7 & 8 Geo. 4), was substituted with the definition of "property" in the Larceny Act 1861 (24 & 25 Vict. c. 96) by section 4 of the Statute Law Revision (Substituted Enactments) Act 1876 (39 & 40 Vict. c. 20), which came into force on 27 June 1876 .

The whole act, except sections 18, 20, 22, 23 and 24, were repealed for England and Wales by section 55(1) of, and the second schedule to, the Summary Jurisdiction Act 1879 (42 & 43 Vict. c. 49), which came into force on 1 January 1880.

Section 20 of the act was repealed by section 29 of the Supreme Court of Judicature (Officers) Act 1879 (42 & 43 Vict. c. 78), which came into force on 28 October 1879.

Sections 5 (in part), 10, 14 (in part), 15, 16 (in part), 17 (in part) and 21 of the act were repealed by section 1 of, and the schedule to, the Statute Law Revision Act 1892 (55 & 56 Vict. c. 19), which came into force on 20 June 1892.

The whole act, so far as unrepealed, was repealed for England and Wales by section 33(3) of, and part II of schedule 3 to, the Theft Act 1968 (c. 60), which came into force on 1 January 1969.

The whole act was repealed for Northern Ireland by the Costs in Criminal Cases Act (Northern Ireland) 1968 (c. 10) and Criminal Injuries to Persons (Compensation) Act 1968 (c. 13), which came into force on 1 March 1969.
