= Australian Waste Lands Act 1855 =

Act of the Parliament of the United Kingdom

Australian Waste Lands Act 1855 (Note: The citation of this act by this short title was authorised by section 1 of, and the first schedule to, the Short Titles Act 1896. Due to the repeal of those provisions it is now authorised by section 19(2) of the Interpretation Act 1978.)
- Act of Parliament
- Parliament of the United Kingdom
- Long title: An Act to repeal the Acts of Parliament now in force respecting the Disposal of the Waste Lands of the Crown in Her Majesty's Australian Colonies, and to make other Provision in lieu thereof.
- Citation: 18 & 19 Vict. c. 56
- Territorial extent: United Kingdom

Dates
- Royal assent: 16 July 1855
- Commencement: 16 July 1855 (Note: The Acts of Parliament (Commencement) Act 1793.)
Other legislation
Amends	See § Repealed enactments
Repeals/revokes	See § Repealed enactments

Status: Current legislation

Text of statute as originally enacted

The Australian Waste Lands Act 1855 (18 & 19 Vict. c. 56) is an act of the Parliament of the United Kingdom that repealed the earlier Imperial statutes governing the sale and disposal of Crown waste land in the Australian colonies, and made new provision under which the legislatures of New South Wales, Victoria, Van Diemen's Land and South Australia could in future regulate the disposal of Crown land, and the revenue arising from it, within their own territories.

== Background ==
By 1855, the colonies of New South Wales and Victoria were moving towards responsible government under new constitutions, and control of the revenue from Crown land sales was regarded, alongside representative government itself, as one of the powers the colonies most wished to obtain from the Imperial Parliament. Introducing the bill for the act in the House of Commons on 17 May 1855, alongside the bill to confirm New South Wales's new constitution, Lord John Russell described it as giving the colony "that control over its own waste lands which it and other colonies ... much desire to possess."

== Provisions ==
=== Repealed enactments ===
Section 1 of the act repealed 2 enactments, listed in that section.

Citation	Short title	Description	Extent of repeal
5 & 6 Vict. c. 36	Australian Colonies Waste Lands Act 1842	An Act for regulating the Sale of Waste Land belonging to the Crown in the Australian Colonies.	The whole act.
9 & 10 Vict. c. 104	Waste Lands (Australia) Act 1846	An Act to amend an Act for regulating the Sale of Waste Land belonging to the Crown in the Australian Colonies, and to make further Provision for the Management thereof.	The whole act.

== Subsequent developments ==
The act extended to New South Wales, and its provisions were inherited by the colony (later state) of Queensland when it was separated from New South Wales in 1859. It remains part of Queensland's statute book, with the exception of sections 1, 2 and 7.
