= Lunacy Act 1890 =

Act of the Parliament of the United Kingdom

Lunacy Act 1890 (Note: Section 1.)
- Act of Parliament
- Parliament of the United Kingdom
- Long title: An Act to consolidate certain of the Enactments respecting Lunatics.
- Citation: 53 & 54 Vict. c. 5
- Introduced by: Hardinge Giffard, 1st Earl of Halsbury (Lords)
- Territorial extent: England and Wales; Scotland; Ireland; (Note: Section 2. Extended to Scotland and Ireland)

Dates
- Royal assent: 29 March 1890
- Commencement: 1 May 1890 (Note: Section 3.)
- Repealed: England and Wales: 1 November 1960; Scotland and Northern Ireland: 1 June 1962 (Note: The Mental Health (Scotland) Act 1960 (Appointed Day No. 3) Order 1962 (SI 1962/516).)

Other legislation
- Amends: See § Repealed enactments
- Repeals/revokes: See § Repealed enactments
- Amended by: Lunacy Act 1891; Trustee Act 1893; Public Authorities Protection Act 1893; Lunacy Act 1908; Forgery Act 1913; Trustee Act 1925; Mental Treatment Act 1930; Local Government Act 1933; Law Reform (Miscellaneous Provisions) Act 1949; Justices of the Peace Act 1949; Mental Health Act 1959
- Repealed by: England and Wales: Mental Health Act 1959; Scotland and Northern Ireland: Mental Health (Scotland) Act 1960

Status: Repealed

History of passage through Parliament

Records of Parliamentary debate relating to the statute from Hansard

Text of statute as originally enacted

The Lunacy Act 1890 (53 & 54 Vict. c. 5) was an act of the Parliament of the United Kingdom that formed the basis of mental health law in England and Wales from 1890 until 1959.

The act placed an obligation on local authorities to maintain institutions for the mentally ill.

== Background ==
In 1889, the Lunacy Acts Amendment Act 1889 (52 & 53 Vict. c. 41) was passed, which, amongst other things, provided that from 1 May 1890, private patients would be received only under order of county court judge, magistrate, or justice of the peace.

On 17 February 1890, the First Lord of the Treasury, W. H. Smith MP confirmed the government's intention to introduce a simple bill to consolidate the mental health law of England and Wales and act as a code of guidance of those concerned in the administration of the law.

== Passage ==
The Lunacy Consolidation Bill had its first reading in the House of Lords on 20 February 1890, introduced by the Lord Chancellor, Hardinge Giffard, 1st Earl of Halsbury. The bill had its second reading in the House of Lords on 21 February 1890 and was committed to a committee of the whole house, which met and reported on 13 March 1890, with amendments. The amended bill had its third reading in the House of Lords on 17 March 1890 and passed, with amendments.

The amended bill had its first reading in the House of Commons on 17 March 1890. The bill had its second reading in the House of Commons on 20 March 1890 and was committed to a select committee, following objections from Charles Kearns Deane Tanner MP. The select committee was discharged on 24 March 1890 and the bill was committed to the Select Committee on the Statute Law Revision Bill, which reported on 25 March 1890, without amendments. The bill was re-committed to a committee of the whole house, which met and reported on 27 March 1890, without amendments. The bill had its third reading in the House of Commons on 27 March 1890 and passed, without amendments.

The bill was granted royal assent on 29 March 1890.

== Repealed enactments ==
Section 5 of the act repealed 27 enactments, listed in the fifth schedule to the act, provided that repeals would not affect any jurisdiction or practice established, confirmed or transferred, or salary or compensation or superannuation secured, by any repealed acts.

Citation	Short title	Title	Extent of repeal
4 & 5 Will. 4. c. 76	Poor Law Amendment Act 1834	An Act for the amendment and better administration of the Laws relating to the Poor in England and Wales.	Section forty-five.
8 & 9 Vict. c. 100	Lunacy Act 1845	An Act for the regulation of the care and treatment of lunatics.	The whole act.
13 & 14 Vict. c. 60	Trustee Act 1850	The Trustee Act, 1850	Sections three, four, five, six, and fifty-six. Sections twenty, twenty-six, twenty-seven, twenty-eight, thirty-one, forty, forty-one, forty-two, forty-four, forty-five, fifty-one, fifty-two, and fifty-three, so far as they relate to "the Lord Chancellor entrusted as aforesaid." Except so far as the above sections relate to Ireland.
15 & 16 Vict. c. 48	Property of Lunatics Act 1852	An Act for the amendment of the law respecting the property of lunatics.	The whole act.
15 & 16 Vict. c. 55	Trustee Act 1852	An Act to extend the provisions of the Trustee Act, 1850.	Sections six and seven, so far as relates to the Lord Chancellor entrusted as aforesaid, and sections ten and eleven. Except so far as the above sections relate to Ireland.
16 & 17 Vict. c. 70	Lunacy Regulation Act 1853	The Lunacy Regulation Act, 1853.	The whole act.
16 & 17 Vict. c. 96	Care and Treatment of Lunatics Act 1853	An Act to amend an Act passed in the ninth year of Her Majesty for the regulation of the care and treatment of lunatics.	The whole act.
16 & 17 Vict. c. 97	Lunatic Asylums Act 1853	The Lunatic Asylums Act, 1853.	The whole act.
18 & 19 Vict. c. 13 (Note: Incorrectly cited as "18 Vict. c. 13")	Lunacy Act 1855	An Act to amend and extend the Lunacy Act, 1853.	The whole act.
18 & 19 Vict. c. 105	Lunacy Regulation Act 1855	An Act to amend the Lunatic Asylums Act, 1853, and the Acts passed in the ninth and sixteenth years of Her Majesty for the regulation of the Care and Treatment of Lunatics.	The whole act.
19 & 20 Vict. c. 87	Lunatic Asylums Act 1856	An Act to amend the Lunatic Asylums Act, 1853.	The whole act.
23 & 24 Vict. c. 127	Solicitors Act 1860	An Act to amend the law relating to attorneys, solicitors, proctors, and certificated conveyancers.	Section twenty-nine.
24 & 25 Vict. c. 55	Poor Removal Act 1861	An Act to amend the laws regulating the removal of the poor and the contribution of parishes to the common fund in unions.	Section seven.
25 & 26 Vict. c. 86	Lunacy Regulation Act 1862	The Lunacy Regulation Act, 1862.	The whole act.
25 & 26 Vict. c. 111	Lunacy Acts Amendment Act 1862	The Lunacy Acts Amendment Act, 1862.	The whole act.
26 & 27 Vict. c. 110	Lunacy Acts Amendment Act 1863	The Lunacy Act Amendment Act, 1863.	The whole act.
28 & 29 Vict. c. 80	Lunacy Act Amendment Act 1865	The Lunacy Act Amendment Act, 1865.	The whole act.
30 & 31 Vict. c. 6 (Note: Incorrectly cited as "30 Vict. c. 6".)	Metropolitan Poor Act 1867	The Metropolitan Poor Act, 1867.	In section thirty, the words "and every such asylum" to the end of the section.
30 & 31 Vict. c. 87	Court of Chancery (Officers) Act 1867	The Court of Chancery (Officers) Act, 1867.	Section thirteen.
30 & 31 Vict. c. 106	Poor Law Amendment Act 1867	The Poor Law Amendment Act, 1867.	Section twenty-three, except as regards persons suffering from delirium tremens, or from bodily disease of a contagious or infectious character.
31 & 32 Vict. c. 122	Poor Law Amendment Act 1867	The Poor Law Amendment Act, 1868.	Section forty-three.
34 & 35 Vict. c. 14	County Property Act 1871	The County Property Act, 1871.	Section two.
38 & 39 Vict. c. 77	Supreme Court of Judicature Act 1875	The Supreme Court of Judicature Act, 1875.	Section seven. In section twenty-six, the words "(including the percentage on estates of lunatics)" and the words "(including the masters and other officers in lunacy)".
45 & 46 Vict. c. 82	Lunacy Regulation Amendment Act 1882	The Lunacy Regulation Amendment Act, 1882.	The whole act.
48 & 49 Vict. c. 52	Lunacy Acts Amendment Act 1885	The Lunacy Acts Amendment Act, 1885.	The whole act.
51 & 52 Vict. c. 41	Local Government Act 1888	The Local Government Act, 1888.	Section thirty-two, sub-section three, sub-clause (c); section eighty-six, sub-sections one, two, three, four, six, seven, and eight.
52 & 53 Vict. c. 41	Lunacy Acts Amendment Act 1889	The Lunacy Acts Amendment Act, 1889.	The whole act.

== Subsequent developments ==
Section 301 of the act was repealed by section 2 of, and the schedule to, the Public Authorities Protection Act 1893 (56 & 57 Vict. c. 61), which came into force on 1 January 1894.

The whole act was repealed for England and Wales by section 149(1) of, and part I of the eighth schedule to, Mental Health Act 1959 (7 & 8 Eliz. 2. c. 72), which came into force on 1 November 1960.

The whole act was repealed for Scotland and Northern Ireland by section 113(2) of, and the fifth schedule to, the Mental Health (Scotland) Act 1960 (8 & 9 Eliz. 2. c. 61), which came into force on 1 June 1962.

== See also ==
- Statute Law Revision Act
