= Lunatic Asylums Act 1853 =

Act of the Parliament of the United Kingdom

Lunatic Asylums Act 1853 (Note: Section 136.)
- Act of Parliament
- Parliament of the United Kingdom
- Long title: An Act to consolidate and amend the Laws for the Provision and Regulation of Lunatic Asylums for Counties and Boroughs, and for the Maintenance and Care of Pauper Lunatics, in England.
- Citation: 16 & 17 Vict. c. 97
- Territorial extent: England and Wales (Note: Section 135.)

Dates
- Royal assent: 20 August 1853
- Commencement: 1 November 1853 (Note: Section 134.)
- Repealed: 1 May 1890
Other legislation
| Repeals/revokes | See § Repealed enactments |
| Repealed by | Lunacy Act 1890 |
| Relates to | Lunacy Regulation Act 1853 |

Status: Repealed

Text of statute as originally enacted

The Lunatic Asylums Act 1853 (16 & 17 Vict. c. 97) was an act of the Parliament of the United Kingdom that consolidated enactments relating to lunatic asylums in England and Wales.

The Lunacy Regulation Act 1853 (16 & 17 Vict. c. 70) was passed in the same month as the act.

== Provisions ==
Section 1 of the act repealed 3 enactments, listed in the first schedule to the act.

| Citation | Short title | Description | Extent of repeal |
|---|---|---|---|
| 8 & 9 Vict. c. 126 | County Asylums Act 1845 | An Act of the Session holden in the Eighth and Ninth Years of Her Majesty, Chapter One hundred and twenty-six. | The whole act. |
| 9 & 10 Vict. c. 84 | Lunatic Asylums, etc. Act 1846 | An Act of the Session holden in the Ninth and Tenth Years of Her Majesty, Chapter Eighty-four. | The whole act. |
| 10 & 11 Vict. c. 43 | Lunatic Asylums Act 1847 | An Act of the Session holden in the Tenth and Eleventh Years of Her Majesty, Chapter Forty-three. | The whole act. |

== Subsequent developments ==
The whole act was repealed by section 5 of, and the fifth schedule to, the Lunacy Act 1890 (53 & 54 Vict. c. 5), which came into force on 1 May 1890.
