= Lunacy Regulation Act 1853 =

Act of the Parliament of the United Kingdom

Lunacy Regulation Act 1853 (Note: Section 5.)
- Act of Parliament
- Parliament of the United Kingdom
- Long title: An Act for the Regulation of Proceedings under Commissions of Lunacy, and the Consolidation and Amendment of the Acts respecting Lunatics so found by Inquisition, and their Estates.
- Citation: 16 & 17 Vict. c. 70
- Territorial extent: England and Wales; Ireland; (Note: Section 3.)

Dates
- Royal assent: 15 August 1853
- Commencement: 28 October 1853
- Repealed: 1 May 1890
Other legislation
Amends	See § Repealed enactments
Repeals/revokes	See § Repealed enactments
Repealed by	Lunacy Act 1890
Relates to	Lunatic Asylums Act 1853; Lunacy Regulation (Ireland) Act 1871

Status: Repealed

Text of statute as originally enacted

The Lunacy Regulation Act 1853 (16 & 17 Vict. c. 70) was an act of the Parliament of the United Kingdom that consolidated enactments relating to mental health law in England and Wales and Ireland.

The Lunatic Asylums Act 1853 (16 & 17 Vict. c. 97) was passed in the same month as the act.

== Provisions ==
Section 1 of the act repealed 7 enactments, listed in the first schedule to the act.

Citation	Short title	Description	Extent of repeal
6 Geo. 4. c. 53	Lunatics Act 1825	An Act for limiting the Time within which Inquisitions of Lunacy, Idiocy, and Non compos mentis may be traversed, and for making other Regulations in the Proceeding pending a Traverse.	The whole act, except so far as it relates to Ireland.
1 Will. 4. c. 65	Infants' Property Act 1830	An Act for consolidating and amending the Laws relating to Property belonging to Infants, Femes Covert, Idiots, Lunatics, and Persons of unsound Mind.	So much of the Act as relates to or affects Idiots, Lunatics, and Persons of unsound Mind, or their Property, except so far as it relates to Ireland, but excluding from this Exception Section 41, which is in Substance re-enacted by this Act.
3 & 4 Will. 4. c. 36	Commissioners of Lunacy Act 1833	An Act for diminishing the Inconvenience and Expense of Commissions in the Nature of Writs De lunatico inquirendo, and to provide for the better Care and Treatment of Idiots, Lunatics, and Persons of unsound Mind, found such by Inquisition.	The whole act.
3 & 4 Will. 4. c. 84	Lord Chancellor's Offices Act 1833	An Act to provide for the Performance of the Duties of certain Offices connected with the Court of Chancery which have been abolished.	So much of the Act as relates to the Office or Place of "The Secretary of Lunatics."
5 & 6 Vict. c. 84	Lunacy Act 1842	An Act to alter and amend the Practice and Course of Proceeding under Commissions in the Nature of Writs De lunatico inquirendo.	The whole act, except Sections 10, 12, and 16, which relate to the Abolition of an Office, and to the Suitors Fee Fund, and to certain Compensations.
15 & 16 Vict. c. 48	Property of Lunatics Act 1852	An Act for the Amendment of the Law respecting the Property of Lunatics.	Sections 1, 2, and 3, except so far as the same relate to Ireland.
15 & 16 Vict. c. 87	Suitors in Chancery Relief Act 1852	An Act for the Relief of the Suitors of the High Court of Chancery.	Sections 14, 30, 31, 32, and 33, all which are in Substance re-enacted by this Act.

== Subsequent developments ==
The Lunacy Regulation (Ireland) Act 1871 (34 & 35 Vict. c. 22) repealed several enactments in this act.

The whole act was repealed by section 5 of, and the fifth schedule to, the Lunacy Act 1890 (53 & 54 Vict. c. 5), which came into force on 1 May 1890.
