= List of acts of the Parliament of the United Kingdom from 1853 =

This is a complete list of acts of the Parliament of the United Kingdom for the year 1853.

Note that the first parliament of the United Kingdom was held in 1801; parliaments between 1707 and 1800 were either parliaments of Great Britain or of Ireland). For acts passed up until 1707, see the list of acts of the Parliament of England and the list of acts of the Parliament of Scotland. For acts passed from 1707 to 1800, see the list of acts of the Parliament of Great Britain. See also the list of acts of the Parliament of Ireland.

For acts of the devolved parliaments and assemblies in the United Kingdom, see the list of acts of the Scottish Parliament, the list of acts of the Northern Ireland Assembly, and the list of acts and measures of Senedd Cymru; see also the list of acts of the Parliament of Northern Ireland.

The number shown after each act's title is its chapter number. Acts passed before 1963 are cited using this number, preceded by the year(s) of the reign during which the relevant parliamentary session was held; thus the Union with Ireland Act 1800 is cited as "39 & 40 Geo. 3 c. 67", meaning the 67th act passed during the session that started in the 39th year of the reign of George III and which finished in the 40th year of that reign. Note that the modern convention is to use Arabic numerals in citations (thus "41 Geo. 3" rather than "41 Geo. III"). Acts of the last session of the Parliament of Great Britain and the first session of the Parliament of the United Kingdom are both cited as "41 Geo. 3".

Some of these acts have a short title. Some of these acts have never had a short title. Some of these acts have a short title given to them by later acts, such as by the Short Titles Act 1896.

== 16 & 17 Vict. ==
Continuing the first session of the 16th Parliament of the United Kingdom, which met from 4 November 1852 until 20 August 1853.

=== Public general acts ===
| Short title | Citation | Royal assent |
Long title
| Patent Law Act 1853 (repealed) | 16 & 17 Vict. c. 5 | 21 February 1853 |
An Act to substitute Stamp Duties for Fees on passing Letters Patent for Inventions, and to provide for the Purchase for the public Use of certain Indexes of Specifications. (Repealed by Patents, Designs, and Trade Marks Act 1883 (46 & 47 Vict. c. 57))
| Transfer of Aids Act 1853 (repealed) | 16 & 17 Vict. c. 6 | 21 February 1853 |
An Act to apply the Sum of Two Millions to the Service of the Year One thousand eight hundred and fifty-three. (Repealed by Statute Law Revision Act 1875 (38 & 39 Vict. c. 66))
| Valuation (Ireland) Act 1853 (repealed) | 16 & 17 Vict. c. 7 | 21 February 1853 |
An Act to amend an Act relating to the Valuation of rateable Property in Ireland. (Repealed by Valuation (Ireland) Act 1854 (17 & 18 Vict. c. 8))
| Somerset House Act 1853 | 16 & 17 Vict. c. 8 | 18 March 1853 |
An Act for enabling the Commissioners of Inland Revenue to dispose of certain Property in the City of London.
| Mutiny Act 1853 (repealed) | 16 & 17 Vict. c. 9 | 18 March 1853 |
An Act for punishing Mutiny and Desertion, and for the better Payment of the Army and their Quarters. (Repealed by Statute Law Revision Act 1875 (38 & 39 Vict. c. 66))
| Marine Mutiny Act 1853 (repealed) | 16 & 17 Vict. c. 10 | 18 March 1853 |
An Act for the Regulation of Her Majesty's Royal Marine Forces while on shore. (Repealed by Statute Law Revision Act 1875 (38 & 39 Vict. c. 66))
| Annual Inclosure Act 1853 | 16 & 17 Vict. c. 11 | 18 March 1853 |
An Act to authorize the Inclosure of certain Lands in pursuance of a Report of the Inclosure Commissioners for England and Wales.
| Supply Act 1853 (repealed) | 16 & 17 Vict. c. 12 | 18 March 1853 |
An Act to apply the Sum of Eight Millions out of the Consolidated Fund to the Service of the Year One thousand eight hundred and fifty-three. (Repealed by Statute Law Revision Act 1875 (38 & 39 Vict. c. 66))
| Grand Jury Cess (Ireland) Act 1853 (repealed) | 16 & 17 Vict. c. 13 | 18 March 1853 |
An Act to revive certain temporary Provisions relating to the Collection of Grand Jury Cess in Ireland. (Repealed by Statute Law Revision Act 1875 (38 & 39 Vict. c. 66))
| Indemnity Act 1853 (repealed) | 16 & 17 Vict. c. 14 | 18 March 1853 |
An Act to indemnify such Persons in the United Kingdom as have omitted to qualify themselves for Offices and Employments, and to extend the Time limited for those Purposes respectively. (Repealed by Promissory Oaths Act 1871 (34 & 35 Vict. c. 48))
| Parliamentary Elections (Polling) Act 1853 (repealed) | 16 & 17 Vict. c. 15 | 18 March 1853 |
An Act to limit the Time of taking the Poll in Counties at contested Elections for Knights of the Shire to serve in Parliament in England and Wales to One Day. (Repealed by Representation of the People Act 1948 (11 & 12 Geo. 6. c. 65))
| Slave Trade Suppression (Treaty with Sohar) Act 1853 (repealed) | 16 & 17 Vict. c. 16 | 9 May 1853 |
An Act for carrying into effect the Engagement between Her Majesty and Syed Syf bin Hamood, the Chief of Sohar, (Note: Sohar, Oman.) in Arabia, for the more effectual Suppression of the Slave Trade. (Repealed by Slave Trade Act 1873 (36 & 37 Vict. c. 88))
| Slave Trade Suppression (Treaty with New Granada) Act 1853 (repealed) | 16 & 17 Vict. c. 17 | 9 May 1853 |
An Act for carrying into effect the Treaty between Her Majesty and the Republic of New Granada (Note: Republic of New Granada.) for the Suppression of the Slave Trade. (Repealed by Slave Trade Act 1873 (36 & 37 Vict. c. 88))
| Metropolitan Improvements (Repayment out of Consolidated Fund) Act 1853 or the Metropolitan Improvements Act 1853 | 16 & 17 Vict. c. 18 | 9 May 1853 |
An Act to authorize Advances out of the Consolidated Fund to discharge Monies borrowed on the Security of the Land Revenues of the Crown, for the Purpose of Metropolitan Improvements, and providing for the Payment of such Advances and of certain Monies charged on the London Bridge Approaches Fund.
| New Forest Deer Removal Act 1853 (repealed) | 16 & 17 Vict. c. 19 | 9 May 1853 |
An Act to amend an Act of the Fifteenth Year of Her present Majesty (New Forest Deer Removal), (Note: New Forest Act 1851 (14 & 15 Vict. c. 76)) as regards the Publication of Claims, and the preferring and delivering Objections thereto. (Repealed by Statute Law Revision Act 1875 (38 & 39 Vict. c. 66))
| Evidence (Scotland) Act 1853 | 16 & 17 Vict. c. 20 | 9 May 1853 |
An Act to alter and amend an Act of the Fifteenth Year of Her present Majesty for amending the Law of Evidence in Scotland.
| Clergy Reserves, Canada Act 1853 | 16 & 17 Vict. c. 21 | 9 May 1853 |
An Act to authorize the Legislature of the Province of Canada to make Provision concerning the Clergy Reserves in that Province, and the Proceeds thereof.
| Court of Chancery Examiners Act 1853 (repealed) | 16 & 17 Vict. c. 22 | 9 May 1853 |
An Act for making further Provision for the Execution of the Office of Examiner of the High Court of Chancery. (Repealed by Statute Law Revision Act 1892 (55 & 56 Vict. c. 19))
| National Debt Act 1853 (repealed) | 16 & 17 Vict. c. 23 | 9 May 1853 |
An Act for redeeming or commuting the Annuity payable to the South Sea Company, and certain Annuities of Three Pounds per Centum per Annum, and for creating new Annuities of Three Pounds Ten Shillings per Centum per Annum, and Two Pounds Ten Shillings per Centum per Annum, and issuing Exchequer Bonds. (Repealed by Statute Law Revision Act 1870 (33 & 34 Vict. c. 69))
| Public Health Supplemental Act 1853 (No. 1) or the Public Health Supplemental (No. 1) Act 1853 | 16 & 17 Vict. c. 24 | 9 May 1853 |
An Act to confirm and extend certain Provisional Orders of the General Board of Health for the Towns of Wakefield, Elland, Wallasey, Dudley, Barnsley, Dorchester, and Welshpool.
| | Provisional Order for the Application of the Public Health Act (Note: Public Health Act 1848 (11 & 12 Vict. c. 63)) to the Borough of Wakefield, in the County of York. | |
| | Provisional Order for the Application of the Public Health Act to the District of Elland, in the County of York. | |
| | Provisional Order for the Application of the Public Health Act, 1848, to the District of Wallasey, in the County of Chester. | |
| | Provisional Order for the Application of the Public Health Act, 1848, to the Parish of Dudley, in the County of Worcester. | |
| | Provisional Order for the Application of the Public Health Act, 1848, to the District of Barnsley, in the County of York. | |
| | Provisional Order for the Application of the Public Health Act to the Borough of Dorchester, in the County of Dorset. | |
| | Provisional Order for the Application of the Public Health Act to the District of Welshpool, in the County of Montgomery. | |
| Exchequer Bills Act 1853 (repealed) | 16 & 17 Vict. c. 25 | 13 May 1853 |
An Act for raising the Sum of Seventeen millions seven hundred and forty-two thousand five hundred Pounds by Exchequer Bills, for the Service of the Year One thousand eight hundred and fifty-three. (Repealed by Statute Law Revision Act 1875 (38 & 39 Vict. c. 66))
| Burgh Council Elections (Scotland) Act 1853 (repealed) | 16 & 17 Vict. c. 26 | 14 June 1853 |
An Act to provide for the supplying of Vacancies in Town Councils of Burghs in Scotland consequent on null or irregular Elections. (Repealed by Elections (Scotland) (Corrupt and Illegal Practices) Act 1890 (53 & 54 Vict. c. 55))
| Berwickshire Courts Act 1853 (repealed) | 16 & 17 Vict. c. 27 | 14 June 1853 |
An Act for empowering the Sheriff and Commissary of Berwickshire to hold Courts at Dunse, and for other Purposes. (Repealed by Berwickshire County Town Act 1903 (3 Edw. 7. c. 5))
| County Elections (Scotland) Act 1853 (repealed) | 16 & 17 Vict. c. 28 | 14 June 1853 |
An Act to amend the Law as to taking the Poll at Elections of Members to serve in Parliament for Scotland. (Repealed by Representation of the People Act 1948 (11 & 12 Geo. 6. c. 65))
| Weights in Sales of Bullion Act 1853 (repealed) | 16 & 17 Vict. c. 29 | 14 June 1853 |
An Act for regulating the Weights used in Sales of Bullion. (Repealed by Weights and Measures Act 1878 (41 & 42 Vict. c. 49))
| Criminal Procedure Act 1853 | 16 & 17 Vict. c. 30 | 14 June 1853 |
An Act for the better Prevention and Punishment of aggravated Assaults upon Women and Children, and for preventing Delay and Expense in the Administration of certain Parts of the Criminal Law.
| Supply (No. 2) Act 1853 (repealed) | 16 & 17 Vict. c. 31 | 14 June 1853 |
An Act to apply the Sum of Four Millions out of the Consolidated Fund to the Service of the Year One thousand eight hundred and fifty-three. (Repealed by Statute Law Revision Act 1875 (38 & 39 Vict. c. 66))
| Bail in Error Act 1853 (repealed) | 16 & 17 Vict. c. 32 | 28 June 1853 |
An Act to make further Provision for staying Execution of Judgment for Misdemeanors upon giving Bail in Error. (Repealed by Statute Law Revision Act 1892 (55 & 56 Vict. c. 19))
| London Hackney Carriage Act 1853 | 16 & 17 Vict. c. 33 | 28 June 1853 |
An Act for the better Regulation of Metropolitan Stage and Hackney Carriages, and for prohibiting the Use of advertising Vehicles.
| Income Tax Act 1853 (repealed) | 16 & 17 Vict. c. 34 | 28 June 1853 |
An Act for granting to Her Majesty Duties on Profits arising from Property, Professions, Trades, and Offices. (Repealed by Income Tax Act 1918 (8 & 9 Geo. 5. c. 40))
| Cathedral Churches, etc. Act 1853 (repealed) | 16 & 17 Vict. c. 35 | 8 July 1853 |
An Act to make Provision concerning the future Regulation of certain Appointments connected with Cathedral and Collegiate Churches, and concerning certain of the Estates of the Deans and Chapters of York and Carlisle. (Repealed by Statute Law Revision Act 1875 (38 & 39 Vict. c. 66))
| Whichwood Disafforesting Act 1853 or the Whichwood Forest Act 1853 (repealed) | 16 & 17 Vict. c. 36 | 8 July 1853 |
An Act for disafforesting the Forest of Whichwood. (Repealed by Crown Estate Act 1961 (9 & 10 Eliz. 2. c. 55) and Wild Creatures and Forest Laws Act 1971 (c. 47))
| Duties on Spirits, etc. Act 1853 (repealed) | 16 & 17 Vict. c. 37 | 8 July 1853 |
An Act to impose additional Duties on Sprits in Scotland and Ireland; and to alter the Countervailing Duties on Spirits the Manufacture of Guernsey, Jersey, Alderney, or Sark, imported into Scotland or Ireland, and the Countervailing Duties and Drawbacks on the Removal of certain Mixtures and Compounds between Scotland, Ireland, and England respectively; and to amend the Laws relating to the collecting and securing the Duties of Excise upon Spirits. (Repealed by Statute Law Revision Act 1875 (38 & 39 Vict. c. 66))
| Malicious Injuries (Ireland) Act 1853 or the Malicious Injuries (Northern Ireland) Act 1853 (repealed) | 16 & 17 Vict. c. 38 | 8 July 1853 |
An Act to extend the Remedies for the Compensation of malicious Injuries to Property in Ireland. (Repealed by Northern Ireland Act 1962 (10 & 11 Eliz. 2. c. 30))
| Soap Duties Repeal Act 1853 (repealed) | 16 & 17 Vict. c. 39 | 8 July 1853 |
An Act to repeal the Duties, Allowances, and Drawbacks of Excise on Soap. (Repealed by Statute Law Revision Act 1875 (38 & 39 Vict. c. 66))
| Public Works Loan Act 1853 or the Public Works Loans Act 1853 (repealed) | 16 & 17 Vict. c. 40 | 8 July 1853 |
An Act for altering the Mode of Repayment of Advances by the Public Works Loan Commissioners under the Public Health Act, 1848, and other Acts. (Repealed by Public Works Loans Act 1875 (38 & 39 Vict. c. 89))
| Common Lodging Houses Act 1853 or the Common Lodging House Act 1853 (repealed) | 16 & 17 Vict. c. 41 | 4 August 1853 |
An Act for making further Provisions with respect to Common Lodging Houses. (Repealed by Public Health (London) Act 1936 (26 Geo. 5 & 1 Edw. 8. c. 50))
| Whittlewood Disafforesting Act 1853 (repealed) | 16 & 17 Vict. c. 42 | 4 August 1853 |
An Act for disafforesting the Forest of Whittlewood otherwise Whittlebury. (Repealed by Crown Estate Act 1961 (9 & 10 Eliz. 2. c. 55) and Wild Creatures and Forest Laws Act 1971 (c. 47))
| Convicted Prisoners Removal, etc. Act 1853 (repealed) | 16 & 17 Vict. c. 43 | 4 August 1853 |
An Act for enabling the Justices of Counties to contract in certain Cases for the Maintenance and Confinement of convicted Prisoners in the Gaols of adjoining Counties. (Repealed by Prison Act 1865 (28 & 29 Vict. c. 126))
| Pimlico Improvement Act 1853 | 16 & 17 Vict. c. 44 | 4 August 1853 |
An Act to enlarge and extend the Powers of an Act of the Fifteenth and Sixteenth Years of Her present Majesty, for enabling the Commissioners of Her Majesty's Works and Public Buildings to complete Improvements in Pimlico, and in the Neighbourhood of Buckingham Palace.
| Government Annuities Act 1853 (repealed) | 16 & 17 Vict. c. 45 | 4 August 1853 |
An Act to consolidate and amend the Laws and to grant additional Facilities in relation to the Purchase of Government Annuities through the Medium of Saving Banks, and to make other Provisions in respect thereof. (Repealed by Government Annuities Act 1929 (19 & 20 Geo. 5. c. 29))
| Westminster Bridge Act 1853 | 16 & 17 Vict. c. 46 | 4 August 1853 |
An Act to transfer Westminster Bridge and the Estates of "The Commissioners of Westminster Bridge" to the Commissioners of Her Majesty's Works and Public Buildings; and to enable such last-mentioned Commissioners to remove the present Bridge, and to build a new Bridge on or near the Site thereof.
| Battersea Park Act 1853 (repealed) | 16 & 17 Vict. c. 47 | 4 August 1853 |
An Act to provide for the Purchase and Extinguishment of all Rights of Common and Lammas and other Commonable Rights over the Site of Battersea Park in the County of Surrey. (Repealed by Statute Law (Repeals) Act 2004 (c. 14))
| Coinage (Colonial Offences) Act 1853 (repealed) | 16 & 17 Vict. c. 48 | 4 August 1853 |
An Act for the Punishment of Offences in the Colonies in relation to the Coin. (Repealed by Statute Law (Repeals) Act 1976 (c. 16))
| Colonial Bishops Act 1853 (repealed) | 16 & 17 Vict. c. 49 | 4 August 1853 |
An Act to extend the Provisions of an Act of the Fifteenth and Sixteenth Years of Her present Majesty, intituled "An Act to enable Colonial and other Bishops to perform certain Episcopal Functions, wider Commission from Bishops of England and Ireland." (Note: Colonial Bishops Act 1852 (15 & 16 Vict. c. 52)) (Repealed by Statute Law (Repeals) Measure 2018 (No. 1))
| Ecclesiastical Commissioners (Exchange of Patronage) Act 1853 (repealed) | 16 & 17 Vict. c. 50 | 4 August 1853 |
An Act to effect Exchange of Patronage by Archbishops, Bishops, and other Ecclesiastical Corporations. (Repealed by Patronage (Benefices) Measure 1986 (No. 3))
| Succession Duty Act 1853 (repealed) | 16 & 17 Vict. c. 51 | 4 August 1853 |
An Act for granting to Her Majesty Duties on Succession to Property, and for altering certain Provisions of the Acts charging Duties on Legacies and Shares of Personal Estates. (Repealed by Crown Suits, &c. Act 1865 (28 & 29 Vict. c. 104), Statute Law Revision Act 1892 (55 & 56 Vict. c. 19), Finance Act 1949 (12, 13 & 14 Geo. 6. c. 47), Northern Ireland (Crown Proceedings) Order 1949 (SI 1949/1836) and Finance Act 1975 (c. 7))
| Spitalfields and Shoreditch New Street Act 1853 | 16 & 17 Vict. c. 52 | 4 August 1853 |
An Act to extend the Time for constructing a new Street from Spitalfields to Shoreditch, and to amend the Acts relating thereto.
| Bankruptcy (Scotland) Act 1853 (repealed) | 16 & 17 Vict. c. 53 | 4 August 1853 |
An Act to amend the Laws relating to Bankruptcy in Scotland. (Repealed by Bankruptcy (Scotland) Act 1856 (19 & 20 Vict. c. 79))
| Customs Act 1853 (repealed) | 16 & 17 Vict. c. 54 | 4 August 1853 |
An Act to alter certain Duties of Customs. (Repealed by Statute Law Revision Act 1861 (24 & 25 Vict. c. 101))
| Taxing Officer (Ireland) Act 1853 (repealed) | 16 & 17 Vict. c. 55 | 4 August 1853 |
An Act to make better Provision for the efficient Discharge of the Duties of the Taxing Officer in and for the Common Law Business in Ireland. (Repealed by Statute Law Revision Act 1892 (55 & 56 Vict. c. 19))
| Crown Lands Act 1853 (repealed) | 16 & 17 Vict. c. 56 | 4 August 1853 |
An Act to facilitate the Redemption of certain Charges on the Hereditary Possessions and Land Revenues of the Crown, and to make other Provisions in regard to the Management of such Hereditary Possessions and Land Revenues. (Repealed by Statute Law Revision Act 1953 (2 & 3 Eliz. 2. c. 5) and Crown Estate Act 1961 (9 & 10 Eliz. 2. c. 55))
| Copyholds Act 1853 (repealed) | 16 & 17 Vict. c. 57 | 4 August 1853 |
An Act to explain and amend the Copyhold Acts. (Repealed by Copyhold Act 1858 (21 & 22 Vict. c. 94))
| Dublin Parliamentary Revising Act (1853) or the Dublin Parliamentary Revising Act 1853 (repealed) | 16 & 17 Vict. c. 58 | 4 August 1853 |
An Act to authorize the Appointment of Barristers for the Purpose of effecting a complete annual Revision of Lists and Registry of Voters for the City of Dublin, and to remove Doubts as to the Rate Books for the Purposes of such Registry. (Repealed by Statute Law Revision Act 1875 (38 & 39 Vict. c. 66), Statute Law Revision Act 1892 (55 & 56 Vict. c. 19) and Representation of the People Act 1918 (7 & 8 Geo. 5. c. 64))
| Stamp Act 1853 | 16 & 17 Vict. c. 59 | 4 August 1853 |
An Act to repeal certain Stamp Duties, and to grant others in lieu thereof, to amend the Laws relating to Stamp Duties, and to make perpetual certain Stamp Duties in Ireland.
| Resident Magistrates (Ireland) Act 1853 (repealed) | 16 & 17 Vict. c. 60 | 4 August 1853 |
An Act to amend the Acts regulating the Salaries of Resident Magistrates in Ireland. (Repealed by Statute Law Revision Act 1875 (38 & 39 Vict. c. 66))
| Provisional Order Confirmation (Turnpike Debts) Act 1853 (repealed) | 16 & 17 Vict. c. 61 | 4 August 1853 |
An Act to confirm certain Provisional Orders made under an Act of the Fifteenth Year of Her present Majesty, (Note: Turnpike Trusts (Making of Provisional Orders) Act 1851 (14 & 15 Vict. c. 38)) to facilitate Arrangements for the Relief of Turnpike Trusts, and to make certain Provisions respecting Exemptions from Tolls. (Repealed by Statute Law Revision Act 1894 (57 & 58 Vict. c. 56))
| Contagious Diseases (Animals) Act 1853 (repealed) | 16 & 17 Vict. c. 62 | 4 August 1853 |
An Act to extend and continue an Act of the Twelfth Year of Her present Majesty, to prevent the spreading of contagious or infectious Disorders among Sheep, Cattle, and other Animals. (Repealed for England and Wales by Contagious Diseases (Animals) Act 1869 (32 & 33 Vict. c. 70) and for Ireland by Contagious Diseases (Animals) Act 1878 (41 & 42 Vict. c. 74))
| Bankers' Composition (Scotland) Act 1853 (repealed) | 16 & 17 Vict. c. 63 | 4 August 1853 |
An Act to repeal certain Stamp Duties, and to grant others in lieu thereof, to give Relief with respect to the Stamp Duties on Newspapers and Supplements thereto, to repeal the Duty on Advertisements, and otherwise to amend the Laws relating to Stamp Duties. (Repealed by Inland Revenue Repeal Act 1870 (33 & 34 Vict. c. 99), Statute Law Revision Act 1892 (55 & 56 Vict. c. 19) and Finance Act 1972 (c. 41))
| Incumbered Estates (Ireland) Act 1853 (repealed) | 16 & 17 Vict. c. 64 | 15 August 1853 |
An Act for continuing and amending the Act for facilitating the Sale and Transfer of Incumbered Estates in Ireland. (Repealed by Statute Law Revision Act 1892 (55 & 56 Vict. c. 19))
| Vestries Act 1853 (repealed) | 16 & 17 Vict. c. 65 | 15 August 1853 |
An Act to amend the Acts for the Regulation of Parish Vestries. (Repealed by Church of England (Miscellaneous Provisions) Measure 1992 (No. 1))
| Highway Rates Act 1853 (repealed) | 16 & 17 Vict. c. 66 | 15 August 1853 |
An Act to continue an Act for authorizing the Application of Highway Rates to Turnpike Roads. (Repealed by Statute Law Revision Act 1875 (38 & 39 Vict. c. 66))
| Licensing (Scotland) Act 1853 (repealed) | 16 & 17 Vict. c. 67 | 15 August 1853 |
An Act for the better Regulation of Public Houses in Scotland. (Repealed by Licensing (Scotland) Act 1903 (3 Edw. 7. c. 25))
| Parliamentary Elections Act 1853 (repealed) | 16 & 17 Vict. c. 68 | 15 August 1853 |
An Act to limit the Time for proceeding to Election in Counties and Boroughs in England and Wales, and for Polling at Elections for the Universities of Oxford and Cambridge, and for other Purposes. (Repealed by Representation of the People Act 1948 (11 & 12 Geo. 6. c. 65))
| Naval Enlistment Act 1853 (repealed) | 16 & 17 Vict. c. 69 | 15 August 1853 |
An Act to make better Provision concerning the Entry and Service of Seamen, and otherwise to amend the Laws concerning Her Majesty's Navy. (Repealed by Naval Discipline Act 1860 (23 & 24 Vict. c. 123), Admiralty, &c. Acts Repeal Act 1865 (28 & 29 Vict. c. 112), Statute Law Revision Act 1875 (38 & 39 Vict. c. 66), Naval Enlistment Act 1884 (47 & 48 Vict. c. 46), Statute Law Revision Act 1892 (55 & 56 Vict. c. 19), Defence (Transfer of Functions) (No. 1) Order 1964 (SI 1964/488), Armed Forces Act 1966 (c. 45) and Statute Law (Repeals) Act 1969 (c. 52))
| Lunacy Regulation Act 1853 (repealed) | 16 & 17 Vict. c. 70 | 15 August 1853 |
An Act for the Regulation of Proceedings under Commissions of Lunacy, and the Consolidation and Amendment of the Acts respecting Lunatics so found by Inquisition, and their Estates. (Repealed by Lunacy Act 1890 (53 & 54 Vict. c. 5))
| Newspapers Act 1853 (repealed) | 16 & 17 Vict. c. 71 | 15 August 1853 |
An Act to amend the Law relating to the Stamp Duties upon Newspapers. (Repealed by Inland Revenue Repeal Act 1870 (33 & 34 Vict. c. 99))
| Crime and Outrage (Ireland) Act 1853 (repealed) | 16 & 17 Vict. c. 72 | 15 August 1853 |
An Act to continue an Act of the Eleventh Year of Her present Majesty, for the better Prevention of Crime and Outrage in certain Parts of Ireland. (Repealed by Statute Law Revision Act 1875 (38 & 39 Vict. c. 66))
| Naval Volunteers Act 1853 (repealed) | 16 & 17 Vict. c. 73 | 15 August 1853 |
An Act for the Establishment of a Body of Naval Coast Volunteers, and for the temporary Transfer to the Navy, in case of Need, of Seafaring Men employed in other Public Services. (Repealed by Reserve Forces Act 1980 (c. 9))
| Land Tax Redemption Act 1853 (repealed) | 16 & 17 Vict. c. 74 | 15 August 1853 |
An Act to reduce the Terms on which the Land Tax in Great Britain may be redeemed or purchased. (Repealed by Finance Act 1896 (59 & 60 Vict. c. 28))
| Consolidated Annuities (Ireland) Act 1853 (repealed) | 16 & 17 Vict. c. 75 | 15 August 1853 |
An Act for the Remission of the Consolidated Annuities charged upon Districts in Ireland. (Repealed by Statute Law Revision Act 1875 (38 & 39 Vict. c. 66))
| Turnpike Acts (Ireland) Act 1853 (repealed) | 16 & 17 Vict. c. 76 | 15 August 1853 |
An Act to continue certain Acts for regulating Turnpike Roads in Ireland. (Repealed by Statute Law Revision Act 1875 (38 & 39 Vict. c. 66))
| Poor Law Union Charges Act 1853 (repealed) | 16 & 17 Vict. c. 77 | 15 August 1853 |
An Act to continue an Act of the Fifteenth Tear of Her consent Majesty, for charging the Maintenance of certain poor Persons in Unions in England and Wales upon the Common Fund. (Repealed by Statute Law Revision Act 1875 (38 & 39 Vict. c. 66))
| Commissioners for Oaths Act 1853 (repealed) | 16 & 17 Vict. c. 78 | 15 August 1853 |
An Act relating to the Appointment of Persons to administer Oaths in Chancery, and to Affidavits made for Purposes connected with Registration. (Repealed by Commissioners for Oaths Act 1889 (52 & 53 Vict. c. 10))
| Municipal Corporation Act 1853 or the Municipal Corporations Act 1853 (repealed) | 16 & 17 Vict. c. 79 | 15 August 1853 |
An Act for making sundry Provisions with respect to Municipal Corporations in England. (Repealed by Municipal Corporations Act 1882 (45 & 46 Vict. c. 50))
| Sheriff Courts (Scotland) Act 1853 (repealed) | 16 & 17 Vict. c. 80 | 15 August 1853 |
An Act to facilitate Procedure in the Sheriff Courts in Scotland. (Repealed by Statute Law Revision Act 1892 (55 & 56 Vict. c. 19), Sheriff Courts (Scotland) Act 1907 (7 Edw. 7. c. 51) and Criminal Procedure (Scotland) Act 1975 (c. 21))
| Bankruptcy Court Act 1853 (repealed) | 16 & 17 Vict. c. 81 | 15 August 1853 |
An Act to reduce the Salary and Emoluments of the Registrar of Meetings of the Court of Bankruptcy. (Repealed by Bankruptcy Repeal and Insolvent Court Act 1869 (32 & 33 Vict. c. 83))
| Christ College of Brecknock Act 1853 | 16 & 17 Vict. c. 82 | 15 August 1853 |
An Act to provide for the future Regulation and Management and the permanent Endowment of "The College of Christ of Brecknock," founded by King Henry the Eighth, with permissive Powers to unite the same with Saint David's College.
| Evidence Amendment Act 1853 | 16 & 17 Vict. c. 83 | 20 August 1853 |
An Act to amend an Act of the Fourteenth and Fifteenth Victoria, Chapter Ninety-nine. (Note: Evidence Act 1851 (14 & 15 Vict. c. 99))
| Passengers Act Amendment Act 1853 (repealed) | 16 & 17 Vict. c. 84 | 20 August 1853 |
An Act to amend the Passengers Act, 1852, (Note: Passengers Act 1852 (15 & 16 Vict. c. 44)) so far as relates to the Passages of Natives of Asia or Africa, and also Passages between the Island of Ceylon and certain Parts of the East Indies. (Repealed by Merchant Shipping Act 1894 (57 & 58 Vict. c. 60))
| Privy Council Registrar Act 1853 | 16 & 17 Vict. c. 85 | 20 August 1853 |
An Act for removing Doubts as to the Powers of the Registrar of Her Majesty's Privy Council to administer Oaths, and for providing for the Performance of the Duties of such Registrar in his Absence.
| Liberated Africans Act 1853 or the Sierra Leone Act 1853 (repealed) | 16 & 17 Vict. c. 86 | 20 August 1853 |
An Act to remove Doubts as to the Rights of the liberated Africans in Sierra Leone. (Repealed by Statute Law Revision Act 1964 (c. 79))
| Thames Embankment Act 1853 (repealed) | 16 & 17 Vict. c. 87 | 20 August 1853 |
An Act to give to the Commissioners of Her Majesty's Works and Public Buildings extended Time and further Powers for completing the Embankment of the River Thames between Vauxhall and Battersea Bridges, and a new Street from Lower Sloane Street in connexion therewith. (Repealed by Local Law (Greater London Council and Inner London Boroughs) Order 1965 (SI 1965/540))
| Duties on Horses Let for Hire Act 1853 (repealed) | 16 & 17 Vict. c. 88 | 20 August 1853 |
An Act to repeal the Duties payable in respect of Horses let for Hire, and to grant new Duties on Licences to let Horses for Hire. (Repealed by Revenue Act 1869 (32 & 33 Vict. c. 14))
| Universities (Scotland) Act 1853 (repealed) | 16 & 17 Vict. c. 89 | 20 August 1853 |
An Act to regulate the Admission of Professors to the Lay Chairs in the Universities of Scotland. (Repealed by Statute Law Revision Act 1878 (41 & 42 Vict. c. 79), Universities (Scotland) Act 1889 (52 & 53 Vict. c. 55), Statute Law Revision Act 1892 (55 & 56 Vict. c. 19), Statute Law Revision Act 1894 (57 & 58 Vict. c. 56) and Universities (Scotland) Act 1932 (22 & 23 Geo. 5. c. 26))
| Land Tax Redemption (Investment) Act 1853 (repealed) | 16 & 17 Vict. c. 90 | 20 August 1853 |
An Act to repeal certain Duties of Assessed Taxes, and to grant other Duties of the same Description; and to amend the Laws relating to the Application of the Monies arising from the Redemption and Purchase of the Land Tax. (Repealed by Finance Act 1963 (c. 25))
| Income Tax (Insurance) Act 1853 (repealed) | 16 & 17 Vict. c. 91 | 20 August 1853 |
An Act to extend for a limited Time the Provision for Abatement of Income Tax in respect of Insurances on Lives. (Repealed by Income Tax Act 1918 (8 & 9 Geo. 5. c. 40))
| Sheriffs (Scotland) Act 1853 (repealed) | 16 & 17 Vict. c. 92 | 20 August 1853 |
An Act to diminish the Number of Sheriffs in Scotland, and to unite certain Counties in Scotland in so far as regards the Jurisdiction of the Sheriff. (Repealed by Statute Law Revision Act 1892 (55 & 56 Vict. c. 19))
| Burgh Harbours (Scotland) Act 1853 (repealed) | 16 & 17 Vict. c. 93 | 20 August 1853 |
An Act to enable Burghs in Scotland to maintain and improve their Harbours. (Repealed by Local Government (Scotland) Act 1973 (c. 65))
| Entail Amendment Act 1853 (repealed) | 16 & 17 Vict. c. 94 | 20 August 1853 |
An Act to extend the benefits of the Act of the eleventh and twelfth years of Her present Majesty, for the amendment of the law of entail in Scotland. (Repealed by Abolition of Feudal Tenure etc. (Scotland) Act 2000 (2000 asp 5))
| Government of India Act 1853 or the Government of India (Charter) Act 1853 or the East India Company Act 1853 or the Charter Act 1853 (repealed) | 16 & 17 Vict. c. 95 | 20 August 1853 |
An Act to provide for the Government of India. (Repealed by Government of India Act 1915 (5 & 6 Geo. 5. c. 61))
| Care and Treatment of Lunatics Act 1853 (repealed) | 16 & 17 Vict. c. 96 | 20 August 1853 |
An Act to amend an Act passed in the Ninth Year of Her Majesty, "for the Regulation of the Care and Treatment of Lunatics." (Note: Lunatic Asylums Act 1853 (16 & 17 Vict. c. 97)) (Repealed by Lunacy Act 1890 (53 & 54 Vict. c. 5))
| Lunatic Asylums Act 1853 or the Lunatic Asylum Act 1853 or the County Asylums Act 1853 (repealed) | 16 & 17 Vict. c. 97 | 20 August 1853 |
An Act to consolidate and amend the Laws for the Provision and Regulation of Lunatic Asylums for Counties and Boroughs, and for the Maintenance and Care of Pauper Lunatics, in England. (Repealed by Lunacy Act 1890 (53 & 54 Vict. c. 5))
| Court of Chancery (England) Act 1853 (repealed) | 16 & 17 Vict. c. 98 | 20 August 1853 |
An Act for the further Relief of the Suitors of the High Court of Chancery. (Repealed by Court of Chancery (Funds) Act 1872 (35 & 36 Vict. c. 44) and Statute Law Revision Act 1953 (2 & 3 Eliz. 2. c. 5))
| Penal Servitude Act 1853 (repealed) | 16 & 17 Vict. c. 99 | 20 August 1853 |
An Act to substitute, in certain Cases, other Punishment in lieu of Transportation. (Repealed for England and Wales by Criminal Justice Act 1948 (11 & 12 Geo. 6. c. 58), for Scotland by Criminal Justice (Scotland) Act 1949 (12, 13 & 14 Geo. 6. c. 94) and for Northern Ireland by Criminal Justice (Northern Ireland) Act 1953 (c. 14))
| Vaccination Act 1853 (repealed) | 16 & 17 Vict. c. 100 | 20 August 1853 |
An Act further to extend and make compulsory the Practice of Vaccination. (Repealed by Vaccination Act 1867 (30 & 31 Vict. c. 84))
| Public Libraries Act 1853 (repealed) | 16 & 17 Vict. c. 101 | 20 August 1853 |
An Act to extend the Public Libraries Act, 1850, (Note: Public Libraries Act 1850 (13 & 14 Vict. c. 65)) to Ireland and Scotland. (Repealed for Scotland by Public Libraries Act (Scotland) 1854 (17 & 18 Vict. c. 64) and for Ireland by Public Libraries (Ireland) Act 1855 (18 & 19 Vict. c. 40))
| Defacing the Coin Act 1853 (repealed) | 16 & 17 Vict. c. 102 | 20 August 1853 |
An Act to prevent the defacing of the current Coin of the Realm. (Repealed by Criminal Statutes Repeal Act 1861 (24 & 25 Vict. c. 95))
| Linen, etc., Manufacturers (Ireland) Act 1853 (repealed) | 16 & 17 Vict. c. 103 | 20 August 1853 |
An Act to amend and continue certain Acts relating to Linen, Hempen, and other Manufactures in Ireland. (Repealed by Statute Law Revision Act 1875 (38 & 39 Vict. c. 66))
| Factory Act 1853 or the Factories Act 1853 (repealed) | 16 & 17 Vict. c. 104 | 20 August 1853 |
An Act further to regulate the Employment of Children in Factories. (Repealed by Factory and Workshop Act 1878 (41 & 42 Vict. c. 16))
| Poor Rates Act 1853 (repealed) | 16 & 17 Vict. c. 105 | 20 August 1853 |
An Act to continue the Exemption of Inhabitants from Liability to be rated as such in respect of Stock in Trade or other Property to the Relief of the Poor. (Repealed by Statute Law Revision Act 1875 (38 & 39 Vict. c. 66))
| Customs Tariff Act 1853 or the Customs Act 1853 (repealed) | 16 & 17 Vict. c. 106 | 20 August 1853 |
An Act for consolidating Customs Duties Acts. (Repealed by Customs Tariff Act 1855 (18 & 19 Vict. c. 97))
| Customs Consolidation Act 1853 or the Customs Act 1853 (repealed) | 16 & 17 Vict. c. 107 | 20 August 1853 |
An Act to amend and consolidate the Laws relating to the Customs of the United Kingdom and of the Isle of Man, and certain Laws relating to Trade and Navigation and the British Possessions. (Repealed by Statute Law (Repeals) Act 1986 (c. 12))
| Ecclesiastical Jurisdiction Act 1853 (repealed) | 16 & 17 Vict. c. 108 | 20 August 1853 |
An Act for further continuing certain temporary Provisions concerning Ecclesiastical Jurisdiction in England. (Repealed by Statute Law Revision Act 1875 (38 & 39 Vict. c. 66))
| Loan Societies Act 1853 (repealed) | 16 & 17 Vict. c. 109 | 20 August 1853 |
An Act to continue an Act to amend the Laws relating to Loan Societies. (Repealed by Statute Law Revision Act 1875 (38 & 39 Vict. c. 66))
| Appropriation Act 1853 (repealed) | 16 & 17 Vict. c. 110 | 20 August 1853 |
An Act to apply a Sum out of the Consolidated Fund and the Surplus of Ways and Moans to the Service of the Year One thousand eight hundred and fifty-three, and to appropriate the Supplies granted in this Session of Parliament. (Repealed by Statute Law Revision Act 1875 (38 & 39 Vict. c. 66))
| Land Tax Commissioners (Appointment) Act 1853 (repealed) | 16 & 17 Vict. c. 111 | 20 August 1853 |
An Act to appoint additional Commissioners for executing the Acts for granting a Land Tax and other Rates and Taxes. (Repealed by Statute Law Revision Act 1950 (14 Geo. 6. c. 6))
| Dublin Carriage Act 1853 (repealed) | 16 & 17 Vict. c. 112 | 20 August 1853 |
An Act to consolidate and amend the Laws relating to Hackney and Stage Carriages, also Job Carriages and Horses, and Carts let for Hire, within the Police District of Dublin Metropolis. (Repealed by Statute Law (Repeals) Act 2013 (c. 2))
| Common Law Procedure Amendment Act (Ireland) 1853 or the Common Law Procedure Amendment (Ireland) Act 1853 or the Common Law Procedure (Ireland) Act 1853 (repealed) | 16 & 17 Vict. c. 113 | 20 August 1853 |
An Act to amend the Procedure in the Superior Courts of Common Law in Ireland. (Repealed by Judicature (Northern Ireland) Act 1978 (c. 23))
| Belfast Borough Extension Act 1853 | 16 & 17 Vict. c. 114 | 20 August 1853 |
An Act to extend the Municipal Boundaries of the Borough of Belfast, and to reduce the Scale of rating upon certain Property within the said Borough.
| Patent Law (No. 2) Act 1853 (repealed) | 16 & 17 Vict. c. 115 | 20 August 1853 |
An Act to amend certain Provisions of the Patent Law Amendment Act, 1852, (Note: Patent Law Amendment Act 1852 (15 & 16 Vict. c. 83)) in respect of the Transmission of certified Copies of Letters Patent and Specifications to certain Offices in Edinburgh and Dublin, and otherwise to amend the said Act. (Repealed by Patents, Designs, and Trade Marks Act 1883 (46 & 47 Vict. c. 57))
| Militia Pay Act 1853 (repealed) | 16 & 17 Vict. c. 116 | 20 August 1853 |
An Act to defray the Charge of the Pay, Clothing, and contingent and other Expenses of the Disembodied Militia in Great Britain and Ireland; to grant Allowances in certain Cases to Subaltern Officers, Adjutants, Paymasters, Quartermasters, Surgeons, Assistant Surgeons, Surgeons Mates, and Serjeant Majors of the Militia; and to authorise the Employment of the Non-commissioned Officers. (Repealed by Statute Law Revision Act 1875 (38 & 39 Vict. c. 66))
| Land Tax Redemption (No. 2) Act 1853 (repealed) | 16 & 17 Vict. c. 117 | 20 August 1853 |
An Act to amend the Laws relating to the Redemption and Purchase of the Land Tax in Great Britain. (Repealed by Finance Act 1963 (c. 25))
| Apprehension of Certain Offenders Act 1853 (repealed) | 16 & 17 Vict. c. 118 | 20 August 1853 |
An Act to amend an Act of the Seventh Year of Her Majesty, for the better Apprehension of certain Offenders. (Repealed by Statute Law Revision Act 1875 (38 & 39 Vict. c. 66))
| Betting Act 1853 (repealed) | 16 & 17 Vict. c. 119 | 20 August 1853 |
An Act for the Suppression of Betting Houses. (Repealed for England and Wales and Scotland by Betting and Gaming Act 1960 (8 & 9 Eliz. 2. c. 60) and for Northern Ireland by Betting, Gaming, Lotteries and Amusements (Northern Ireland) Order 1985 (SI 1985/1204))
| Second Annual Inclosure Act 1853 or the Inclosures Act 1853 | 16 & 17 Vict. c. 120 | 20 August 1853 |
An Act to authorize the Inclosure of certain Lands in pursuance of a Special Report of the Inclosure Commissioners for England and Wales.
| Convict Prisons Act 1853 (repealed) | 16 & 17 Vict. c. 121 | 20 August 1853 |
An Act for providing Places of Confinement in England or Wales for Female Offenders under Sentence or Order of Transportation. (Repealed by Criminal Justice Act 1948 (11 & 12 Geo. 6. c. 58))
| Confirmation of Marriages Act 1853 (repealed) | 16 & 17 Vict. c. 122 | 20 August 1853 |
An Act to render valid certain Marriages in the Church of the Holy Trinity in the Township of Hulme and Parish of Manchester in the County of Lancaster. (Repealed by Statute Law (Repeals) Act 1977 (c. 18))
| Investments of Friendly Societies Act 1853 (repealed) | 16 & 17 Vict. c. 123 | 20 August 1853 |
An Act to amend the Laws relating to the Investments of Friendly Societies. (Repealed by Friendly Societies Act 1855 (18 & 19 Vict. c. 63))
| Copyhold, etc., Commission Act 1853 (repealed) | 16 & 17 Vict. c. 124 | 20 August 1853 |
An Act to continue Appointments under the Act (Note: Inclosure Commissioners Act 1851 (14 & 15 Vict. c. 53)) for consolidating the Copyhold and Inclosure Commissions, and for completing Proceedings under the Tithe Commutation Acts. (Repealed by Statute Law Revision Act 1875 (38 & 39 Vict. c. 66))
| Metropolitan Sewers Act 1853 (repealed) | 16 & 17 Vict. c. 125 | 20 August 1853 |
An Act to continue and amend the Metropolitan Sewers Acts. (Repealed by Statute Law Revision Act 1861 (24 & 25 Vict. c. 101))
| Public Health Supplemental Act 1853 (No. 2) or the Public Health Supplemental (No. 2) Act 1853 | 16 & 17 Vict. c. 126 | 20 August 1853 |
An Act to confirm certain Provisional Orders of the General Board of Health for Accrington, Bangor, and Uxbridge, and to provide for conducting the First Election of a Local Board of Health at Elland.
| | Provisional Order for the Application of the Public Health Act to the District of Accrington in the County of Lancaster. | |
| | Provisional Order for altering the Boundaries of the District of Bangor in the County of Carnarvon, as constituted for the Purposes of the Public Health Act, 1848. | |
| | Provisional Order for altering the Boundaries of the District of Uxbridge in the County of Middlesex, as constituted for the Purposes of the Public Health Act, 1848. | |
| London Hackney Carriage (No. 2) Act 1853 (repealed) | 16 & 17 Vict. c. 127 | 20 August 1853 |
An Act to reduce the Duties payable in respect of Hackney Carriages used in the Metropolis, and to amend the Laws relating to the granting of Licences and Payment of Duties in respect of Metropolitan Stage and Hackney Carriages, and to make Provision as to the Charge for the Hire of Hackney Carriages in certain Cases. (Repealed by Statute Law (Repeals) Act 2004 (c. 14))
| Smoke Abatement, London Act 1853 (repealed) | 16 & 17 Vict. c. 128 | 20 August 1853 |
An Act to abate the Nuisance arising from the Smoke of Furnaces in the Metropolis and from Steam Vessels above London Bridge. (Repealed by Public Health (London) Act 1891 (54 & 55 Vict. c. 76))
| Pilotage Law Amendment Act 1853 (repealed) | 16 & 17 Vict. c. 129 | 20 August 1853 |
An Act further to amend the Law relating to Pilotage. (Repealed by Statute Law (Repeals) Act 1986 (c. 12))
| Drainage and Improvement of Lands (Ireland) Act 1853 (repealed) | 16 & 17 Vict. c. 130 | 20 August 1853 |
An Act to amend the Acts for promoting the Drainage of Lands and Improvements in connexion therewith in Ireland. (Repealed by Erne Drainage and Development Act (Northern Ireland) 1950 (c. 15 (N.I.)))
| Merchant Shipping Law Amendment Act 1853 | 16 & 17 Vict. c. 131 | 20 August 1853 |
An Act to amend various Laws relating to Merchant Shipping.
| National Debt (No. 2) Act 1853 (repealed) | 16 & 17 Vict. c. 132 | 20 August 1853 |
An Act to extend the Provisions of an Act of the present Session (Note: National Debt Act 1853 (16 & 17 Vict. c. 23)) for redeeming or commuting the Annuity payable to the South Sea Company and certain Annuities of Three Pounds per Centum per Annum, and to provide for Payments to be made under the said Act. (Repealed by Statute Law Revision Act 1870 (33 & 34 Vict. c. 69))
| Militia Act 1853 (repealed) | 16 & 17 Vict. c. 133 | 20 August 1853 |
An Act to suspend the making of Lists, and the Ballots and Enrolments for the Militia of the United Kingdom, and to amend the Law in relation to the Militia in England. (Repealed by Statute Law Revision Act 1875 (38 & 39 Vict. c. 66))
| Burial Act 1853 or the Metropolitan Burial Act 1853 | 16 & 17 Vict. c. 134 | 20 August 1853 |
An Act to amend the Laws concerning the Burial of the Dead in England beyond the Limits of the Metropolis and to amend the Act (Note: Burial Act 1852 (15 & 16 Vict. c. 85)) concerning the Burial of the Dead in the Metropolis.
| Annual Turnpike Acts Continuance Act 1853 or the Turnpike Roads (England) Act 1853 (repealed) | 16 & 17 Vict. c. 135 | 20 August 1853 |
An Act to continue certain Turnpike Acts in Great Britain, and to make further Provisions concerning Turnpike Roads in England. (Repealed by Statute Law (Repeals) Act 1981 (c. 19))
| Grand Jury (Ireland) Act 1853 | 16 & 17 Vict. c. 136 | 20 August 1853 |
An Act for enabling Grand Juries in Ireland to borrow Money from private Sources on the Security of Presentment, and for transferring to Counties certain Works constructed wholly or in part with Public Money.
| Charitable Trusts Act 1853 (repealed) | 16 & 17 Vict. c. 137 | 20 August 1853 |
An Act for the better Administration of Charitable Trusts. (Repealed by Charities Act 1960 (8 & 9 Eliz. 2. c. 58))

=== Local acts ===
| Short title | Citation | Royal assent |
Long title
| London Assurance Consolidation Act 1853 or the London Insurance Consolidation Act 1853 (repealed) | 16 & 17 Vict. c. i | 9 May 1853 |
An Act to consolidate the Stock and Powers of the Corporation of "The London Assurance of Houses and Goods from Fire" with the Stock and Powers of the Corporation of "The London Assurance," and to confer on the last-named Corporation the Powers of "The London Assurance Loan Company," and to give additional Powers to "The London Assurance." (Repealed by London Assurance Act 1891 (54 & 55 Vict. c. cxxvi))
| Dudley Gas Act 1853 | 16 & 17 Vict. c. ii | 9 May 1853 |
An Act for lighting with Gas the Town of Dudley and the Suburbs thereof.
| Sunderland Gas Amendment Act 1853 (repealed) | 16 & 17 Vict. c. iii | 9 May 1853 |
An Act to enable the Sunderland Corporation Gas Company to raise a further Sum of Money; and to amend and enlarge the Provisions of the Act (Note: Sunderland Gas Act 1846 (9 & 10 Vict. c. xxxvii)) relating to such Company. (Repealed by Sunderland Gas Act 1857 (20 & 21 Vict. c. vii))
| Whittle Dean Waterworks Amendment Act 1853 (repealed) | 16 & 17 Vict. c. iv | 9 May 1853 |
An Act to amend the Act (Note: Whittle Dean Waterworks Act 1845 (8 & 9 Vict. c. lxxi)) relating to the Whittle Dean Water Company, and to enable such Company to maintain additional Works, for better supplying with Water the Inhabitants of the Boroughs of Newcastle-upon-Tyne and Gateshead, and certain Places adjacent and near thereto, in the Counties of Northumberland and Durham. (Repealed by Whittle Dean Waterworks Act 1854 (17 & 18 Vict. c. lx))
| Bangor Waterworks Act 1853 (repealed) | 16 & 17 Vict. c. v | 9 May 1853 |
An Act for better supplying the Inhabitants of Bangor with Water. (Repealed by Bangor Water and Gas Act 1854 (17 & 18 Vict. c. cx))
| Redruth Railway Act 1853 (repealed) | 16 & 17 Vict. c. vi | 9 May 1853 |
An Act to enable the Redruth and Chasewater Railway Company to construct new Works; and for other Purposes. (Repealed by Cornwall County Council Act 1984 (c. xix))
| Bristol Waterworks Amendment Act 1853 (repealed) | 16 & 17 Vict. c. vii | 9 May 1853 |
An Act to authorize the Bristol Waterworks Company to raise an additional Sum of Money by Loan; and for further amending "The Bristol Waterworks Act, 1846." (Note: Bristol Waterworks Act 1846 (9 & 10 Vict. c. ccxxii)) (Repealed by Bristol Waterworks Act 1862 (25 & 26 Vict. c. xxx))
| Ormskirk Gaslight Act 1853 (repealed) | 16 & 17 Vict. c. viii | 9 May 1853 |
An Act for incorporating the Ormskirk Gaslight Company. (Repealed by County of Lancashire Act 1984 (c. xxi))
| Carmarthen Cattle Market Act 1853 (repealed) | 16 & 17 Vict. c. ix | 9 May 1853 |
An Act to enable the Mayor, Aldermen, and Burgesses of the Borough of Carmarthen to provide and maintain a new Cattle Market Place and Slaughter-houses, to amend the Act (Note: Carmarthen Markets Act 1843 (6 & 7 Vict.. c. xii)) for regulating the existing Markets in the said Borough, and for other Purposes. (Repealed by Dyfed Act 1987 (c. xxiv))
| Cork Municipal Corporation Act 1853 | 16 & 17 Vict. c. x | 9 May 1853 |
An Act for the more equal Division of the Borough of Cork into Wards, and to provide for the better Constitution and Regulation of the Municipal Corporation of the said Borough; and for other Purposes.
| Nottingham Gas Act 1853 (repealed) | 16 & 17 Vict. c. xi | 9 May 1853 |
An Act for lighting with Gas the Town of Nottingham, and certain Parishes and Places adjacent thereto. (Repealed by Statute Law (Repeals) Act 1995 (c. 44))
| Devonport Gas and Coke Act 1853 | 16 & 17 Vict. c. xii | 9 May 1853 |
An Act for increasing the Capital and extending the Powers of the Devonport Gas and Coke Company, and for other Purposes.
| Preston Gas Act 1853 (repealed) | 16 & 17 Vict. c. xiii | 9 May 1853 |
An Act to repeal the Preston Gas Company's Act, (Note: Preston Gas Light Company Act 1839 (2 & 3 Vict.. c. iii)) passed in the Second Tear of the Reign of Queen Victoria, and to make other Provisions in lien thereof. (Repealed by Preston Gas Act 1865 (28 & 29 Vict. c. lvii))
| Norfolk Estuary Amendment Act 1853 (repealed) | 16 & 17 Vict. c. xiv | 9 May 1853 |
An Act to amend "The Norfolk Estuary Act, 1846," (Note: Norfolk Estuary Act 1846 (9 & 10 Vict. c. ccclxxxviii)) and "The Norfolk Estuary Amendment Act, 1849." (Note: Norfolk Estuary Amendment Act 1849 (12 & 13 Vict. c. xcv)) (Repealed by Norfolk Estuary Act 1877 (40 & 41 Vict. c. cciii))
| Great Yarmouth Wellington Pier Act 1853 | 16 & 17 Vict. c. xv | 9 May 1853 |
An Act for constructing and maintaining a Pier at Great Yarmouth in the County of Norfolk, to be called "The Great Yarmouth Wellington Pier."
| Evesham Bridge Act 1853 (repealed) | 16 & 17 Vict. c. xvi | 9 May 1853 |
An Act for empowering the Mayor, Aldermen, and Burgesses of the Borough of Evesham in the County of Worcester to build and maintain a Bridge over the River Avon in the said Borough; and for other Purposes. (Repealed by Statute Law (Repeals) Act 1998 (c. 43))
| Great Yarmouth Waterworks Act 1853 | 16 & 17 Vict. c. xvii | 13 May 1853 |
An Act for supplying the Inhabitants of the Town of Great Yarmouth and adjacent Places with Water.
| Lowestoft Water, Gas and Market Act 1853 | 16 & 17 Vict. c. xviii | 13 May 1853 |
An Act for providing Waterworks and Gasworks for the Town of Lowestoft in the County of Suffolk, and for regulating the Market there, and for other Purposes, of which the Short Title is "The Lowestoft Water, Gas, and Market Act, 1853."
| Dublin and Belfast Junction Railway Amendment Act 1853 | 16 & 17 Vict. c. xix | 13 May 1853 |
An Act to amend the Acts relating to the Dublin and Belfast Junction Railway Company, and for other Purposes.
| Crystal Palace Company's Act 1853 (repealed) | 16 & 17 Vict. c. xx | 13 May 1853 |
An Act to enable the Crystal Palace Company to divert certain Roads and to purchase Lands; and for other Purposes relating to the Company. (Repealed by London County Council (Crystal Palace) Act 1951 (14 & 15 Geo. 6. c. xxviii))
| Liverpool Court of Passage Procedure Act 1853 or the Liverpool Court of Passage Amendment Act 1853 (repealed) | 16 & 17 Vict. c. xxi | 14 June 1853 |
An Act for amending the Provisions of certain Acts of Parliament relating to the Civil Court of Record of the Borough of Liverpool, and the Process, Practice, and Mode of Pleading the said Court, and for extending the Jurisdiction thereof. (Repealed by Liverpool Corporation Act 1921 (11 & 12 Geo. 5. c. lxxiv))
| Sheffield Waterworks Act 1853 (repealed) | 16 & 17 Vict. c. xxii | 14 June 1853 |
An Act for enabling the Company of Proprietors of the Sheffield Waterworks to extend their Works, and to obtain a further Supply of Water from the Rivers Rivelin and Loxley and their Tributaries, and for consolidating the Acts relating to such Company. (Repealed by Sheffield Corporation (Consolidation) Act 1918 (8 & 9 Geo. 5. c. lxi))
| Cambridge University and Town Waterworks Act 1853 | 16 & 17 Vict. c. xxiii | 14 June 1853 |
An Act for supplying the Inhabitants of the University and Borough of Cambridge and other Places adjoining thereto with Water.
| Cardiff Waterworks Act 1853 | 16 & 17 Vict. c. xxiv | 14 June 1853 |
An Act for repealing an Act called "The Cardiff Waterworks Act, 1850," (Note: Cardiff Waterworks Act 1850 (13 & 14 Vict. c. lxix)) and granting other Powers in lieu thereof; and for authorizing the Cardiff Waterworks Company to raise further Money.
| Brighton, Hove and Preston Constant Service Act 1853 (repealed) | 16 & 17 Vict. c. xxv | 14 June 1853 |
An Act for better supplying with Water the Parishes of Brighton, Hove, and Preston in the County of Sussex. (Repealed by Brighton, Hove and Preston Constant Service Waterworks Act 1854 (17 & 18 Vict. c. v))
| Stockport Amendment Act 1853 | 16 & 17 Vict. c. xxvi | 14 June 1853 |
An Act for amending the Provisions of existing Local Acts relating to the Borough of Stockport.
| Wakefield Soke Purchase Act 1853 | 16 & 17 Vict. c. xxvii | 14 June 1853 |
An Act for discharging the Inhabitants of the Townships of Wakefield, Alverthorpe-wiih-Thornes, Horbury, Stanley-with-Wrenthorpe, Sandal Magna, and Crigglestone, in the Parishes of Wakefield and Sandal Magna in the West Riding of the County of York, from the Custom of grinding Corn, Grain, and Malt at certain Corn Mills in the said Townships of Wakefield and Harbury and Parish of Sandal Magna, and for making Compensation to the Proprietors of the said Mills.
| Wolverhampton Improvement Act 1853 (repealed) | 16 & 17 Vict. c. xxviii | 14 June 1853 |
An Act for the further Improvement of the Borough of Wolverhampton, and for regulating the Markets therein, and for other Purposes. (Repealed by Wolverhampton Improvement 1869 (32 & 33 Vict. c. cxxxi))
| Blackpool Improvement Act 1853 (repealed) | 16 & 17 Vict. c. xxix | 14 June 1853 |
An Act for better lighting, watching, and otherwise improving the Town of Blackpool and the rest of the Township of Layton with Warbrick in the County Palatine of Lancaster, and for other Purposes, and of which the Short Title is "The Blackpool Improvement Act, 1853." (Repealed by County of Lancashire Act 1984 (c. xxi))
| Great Grimsby Improvement Act 1853 (repealed) | 16 & 17 Vict. c. xxx | 14 June 1853 |
An Act for the Improvement and Regulation of the Borough of Great Grimsby in the County of Lincoln; for better supplying the Inhabitants thereof with Water; for providing a new Burial Ground; for enlarging the Market Place; for making an Outfall for the Sewers of the Town; and for other Purposes. (Repealed by Humberside Act 1982 (c. iii))
| Bury and Radcliffe Waterworks Act 1853 | 16 & 17 Vict. c. xxxi | 14 June 1853 |
An Act for supplying with Water several Townships and Places in the Parishes of Whalley, Bury, Radcliffe, Prestwich-cum-Oldham, and Bolton-le-Moors in Lancashire; and for incorporating the Bury and Radcliffe Waterworks Company.
| Salford Extension and Improvement Act 1853 (repealed) | 16 & 17 Vict. c. xxxii | 14 June 1853 |
An Act for the Extension of the Boundaries of the Municipal Borough of Salford and otherwise improving the said Borough, and for other Purposes. (Repealed by Manchester Corporation Waterworks and Improvement Act 1867 (30 & 31 Vict. c. xxxvi))
| Midland Railway Act 1853 | 16 & 17 Vict. c. xxxiii | 14 June 1853 |
An Act to empower the Midland Railway Company to create new Shares or to grant Annuities for the Extinguishment of their Debenture Debt; and for other Purposes.
| Scottish Central Railway Act 1853 (repealed) | 16 & 17 Vict. c. xxxiv | 14 June 1853 |
An Act to enable the Scottish Central Railway Company to convert their Mortgage and Bond Debt into Debenture Stock. (Repealed by Scottish Central Railway Consolidation Act 1859 (22 & 23 Vict. c. lxxxiii))
| Edinburgh Railway Station Access Act 1853 | 16 & 17 Vict. c. xxxv | 14 June 1853 |
An Act for making a Road or Street from the South End of Waverley Bridge Road, adjoining the General Railway Station at Princes Street, to the High Street in the City of Edinburgh.
| Teignmouth Harbour Act 1853 (repealed) | 16 & 17 Vict. c. xxxvi | 14 June 1853 |
An Act for the Maintenance and Regulation of the Harbour of Teignmouth and the Navigation of the River Teign, and for other Purposes. (Repealed by Pier and Harbour Orders Confirmation (No. 2) Act 1924 (14 & 15 Geo. 5. c. lxxxii))
| Runcorn and Weston Canal Act 1853 | 16 & 17 Vict. c. xxxvii | 14 June 1853 |
An Act for making a Canal from the Francis Dock, connected with the Duke of Bridgewater's Canal at Runcorn in the County of Chester, to join the Weston Canal or River Weaver Navigation at or near Weston Point in the same Parish, and to be called the Runcorn and Weston Canal.
| City of Norwich Waterworks (Amendment) Act 1853 (repealed) | 16 & 17 Vict. c. xxxviii | 14 June 1853 |
An Act to alter and amend the Provisions of "The City of Norwich Waterworks Act, 1850," (Note: City of Norwich Waterworks Act 1850 (13 & 14 Vict. c. lii)) and to grant further Powers to the Company thereby incorporated. (Repealed by Norwich City Council Act 1984 (c. xxiii))
| Reading Corporation Markets Act 1853 | 16 & 17 Vict. c. xxxix | 14 June 1853 |
An Act for establishing a Corn Exchange and regulating the Markets in the Borough of Reading, and for other Purposes, and of which the Short Title is "The Reading Corporation Markets Act, 1853."
| Price's Patent Candle Company's Act 1853 (repealed) | 16 & 17 Vict. c. xl | 14 June 1853 |
An Act to increase the Capital and extend the Powers of Price's Patent Candle Company, and to consolidate the Acts relating to the Company. (Repealed by Price's Patent Candle Company's Act 1855 (18 & 19 Vict. c. xxii))
| Bognor Railway Act 1853 | 16 & 17 Vict. c. xli | 14 June 1853 |
An Act for making a Railway from Chichester to Bognor.
| Oldham Corporation Gas and Water Act 1853 | 16 & 17 Vict. c. xlii | 14 June 1853 |
An Act for enabling the Mayor, Aldermen, and Burgesses of the Borough of Oldham in the County Palatine of Lancaster to purchase and maintain Gasworks and Waterworks; and for other Purposes.
| Shipley Gaslight Act 1853 (repealed) | 16 & 17 Vict. c. xliii | 14 June 1853 |
An Act for enabling the Shipley Gaslight Company to raise a further Sum of Money; and for extending the Limits of their existing Act (Note: Shipley Gas Light Act 1847 (10 & 11 Vict. c. v)) to the adjoining Township o£ Baildon. (Repealed by West Yorkshire Act 1980 (c. xiv))
| Blackburn Gas Act 1853 (repealed) | 16 & 17 Vict. c. xliv | 14 June 1853 |
An Act to extend the Limits of the Blackburn Gaslight Company's Act (Note: Blackburn Gas Act 1838 (1 & 2 Vict. c. l)) for the Supply of Gas, and to authorize the raising of a further Sum of Money, and for other Purposes. (Repealed by Blackburn Improvement Act 1882 (45 & 46 Vict. c. ccxliii))
| Leeds Gaslight Company's Act 1853 (repealed) | 16 & 17 Vict. c. xlv | 14 June 1853 |
An Act to consolidate the Acts relating to the Leeds Gaslight Company, to authorize the Company to raise a further Sum of Money, and for other Purposes. (Repealed by Leeds Corporation (Consolidation) Act 1905 (5 Edw. 7. c. i))
| Madras Railway Act 1853 (repealed) | 16 & 17 Vict. c. xlvi | 14 June 1853 |
An Act for incorporating the Madras Railway Company, and for other Purposes connected therewith. (Repealed by Statute Law (Repeals) Act 2013 (c. 2))
| Severn Navigation Act 1853 | 16 & 17 Vict. c. xlvii | 14 June 1853 |
An Act for making certain Improvements in the River Severn, and for amending the Acts relating thereto.
| Preston Waterworks Act 1853 | 16 & 17 Vict. c. xlviii | 14 June 1853 |
An Act for better supplying with Water the Borough of Preston in the County oi Lancaster, and for authorizing the Local Board of Health for the Borough of Preston aforesaid to purchase the Preston Waterworks.
| Edinburgh Water Company's Act 1853 (repealed) | 16 & 17 Vict. c. xlix | 14 June 1853 |
An Act to enable the Edinburgh Water Company to raise a further Sum of Money; and for other Purposes. (Repealed by Edinburgh Corporation Water Order Confirmation Act 1924 (14 & 15 Geo. 5. c. lxxxvi))
| Dundee Waterworks (Extension) Act 1853 (repealed) | 16 & 17 Vict. c. l | 14 June 1853 |
An Act to enable the Dundee Water Company to construct additional Works for obtaining a further Supply of Water; and for other Purposes. (Repealed by Dundee Corporation (Water, Transport, Finance, &c.) Order Confirmation Act 1954 (2 & 3 Eliz. 2. c. ix))
| Wakefield Borough Market Amendment Act 1853 (repealed) | 16 & 17 Vict. c. li | 14 June 1853 |
An Act to authorize the Wakefield Borough Market Company to raise a further Sum of Money. (Repealed by West Yorkshire Act 1980 (c. xiv))
| Manchester, Sheffield and Lincolnshire Railway (Debenture Stock) Act 1853 | 16 & 17 Vict. c. lii | 28 June 1853 |
An Act to authorize the Creation of Preference Stock by the Manchester, Sheffield, and Lincolnshire Railway Company in lieu of Debentures, and the Reduction, Division, and Consolidation into Stock of the Manchester and Lincoln Union Shares of the said Railway.
| Allendale Turnpike Roads Act 1853 | 16 & 17 Vict. c. liii | 28 June 1853 |
An Act to repeal the Act (Note: Branch End, Allendale and Cows Hill Turnpike Road Act 1826 (7 Geo. 4. c. lxxiv)) for maintaining the Turnpike Road leading out of the Alston Turnpike Road at Branch End in the County of Northumberland, through Catton, Allendale Town, and Allenheads, to Cows Hill in the County of Durham, and to make other Provisions in lieu thereof.
| Lough Swilly Railway Act 1853 | 16 & 17 Vict. c. liv | 28 June 1853 |
An Act for making a Railway from Lough Swilly in the County of Donegal to the River Foyle near the City of Londonderry.
| Langport Eastover, High Ham and Ashcott Turnpike Roads Act 1853 | 16 & 17 Vict. c. lv | 28 June 1853 |
An Act to renew the Term and continue the Powers of an Act passed in the Seventh Year of the Reign of His Majesty King George the Fourth, intituled "An Act for more effectually repairing and improving the Roads leading from Picks Hill near the Town of Langport Eastover in the County of Somerset, through High Ham, Ashcott, and other Places, to Meare in the said County." (Note: Roads through High Ham and Ashcott (Somerset) Act 1826 (7 Geo. 4. c. xxxix))
| York Drainage and Sanitary Improvement Act 1853 | 16 & 17 Vict. c. lvi | 28 June 1853 |
An Act to enable the Mayor, Aldermen, and Citizens of the City of York to purchase the Undertaking of the Foss Navigation Company, and to execute Works for the sanitary Improvement of the said City; to alter the Tolls taken in the Cattle Markets and Fairs of the City, and for other Purposes.
| Portadown and Dungannon Railway Act 1853 | 16 & 17 Vict. c. lvii | 28 June 1853 |
An Act to extend and amend the Powers and Provisions of the "Portadown and Dungannon Railway Act, 1847." (Note: Portadown and Dungannon Railway Act 1847 (10 & 11 Vict. c. cliii.))
| Australian Agricultural Company's Act 1853 (repealed) | 16 & 17 Vict. c. lviii | 28 June 1853 |
An Act to amend an Act passed in the Fifth Year of the Reign of His Majesty King George the Fourth, (Note: Australian Agricultural Company Act 1824 (5 Geo. 4. c. 86)) for granting certain Powers and Authorities to the Australian Agricultural Company, and to alter the Capital of the said Company. (Repealed by Australian Agricultural Company Act 1912 (2 & 3 Geo. 5. c. xlviii))
| Rossendale Waterworks Act 1853 | 16 & 17 Vict. c. lix | 28 June 1853 |
An Act for better supplying with Water the Town or Village of Bacup and the Neighbourhood thereof in Lancashire.
| Great Northern Railway (Increase of Capital) Act 1853 | 16 & 17 Vict. c. lx | 28 June 1853 |
An Act to amend the Acts relating to the Great Northern Railway Company, to authorize an Increase of Capital, and for other Purposes.
| Swaffham Drainage Act 1853 | 16 & 17 Vict. c. lxi | 28 June 1853 |
An Act to consolidate and amend Three several Acts passed in the Reign of King George the Third, (Note: Bedford Level and Swaffham Drainage Act 1767 (7 Geo. 3 c. 53)) (Note: Swaffham (Drainage) Act 1779 (19 Geo. 3 c. 34)) (Note: Bedford Level Drainage Act 1819 (59 Geo. 3 c. lxxviii)) for draining and preserving certain Fen Lands and Low Grounds lying in the South Level, Part of the Great Level of the Fens commonly called Bedford Level, and in the County of Cambridge, between the River Cam otherwise Grant, West, and the Hard Lands of Bottitham, Swaffham-Bulbeek, and Swaffham Prior, East; and for other Purposes therein mentioned.
| Gravesend and Wrotham Road Act 1853 | 16 & 17 Vict. c. lxii | 28 June 1853 |
An Act for more effectually repairing the Road from Gravesend to Wrotham, and from thence to Borough Green, all in the County of Kent.
| Darenth Valley Railway Act 1853 | 16 & 17 Vict. c. lxiii | 28 June 1853 |
An Act for making a Railway from Dartford in the County of Kent to Farningham in the same County, to he called the Darenth Valley Railway; and for other Purposes.
| Ludlow Cattle Market Act 1853 | 16 & 17 Vict. c. lxiv | 28 June 1853 |
An Act for constructing a Market for the Sale of Cattle and other Animals in the Borough of Ludlow in the County of Salop.
| Lough Swilly and Lough Foyle Reclamation Amendment Act 1853 | 16 & 17 Vict. c. lxv | 28 June 1853 |
An Act to amend the Acts relating to the Drainage and Embankment of certain Lands in Lough Swilly and Lough Foyle in the Counties of Donegal and Londonderry.
| Weston-super-Mare Waterworks Act 1853 | 16 & 17 Vict. c. lxvi | 28 June 1853 |
An Act for supplying with Water the Town of Weston-super-Mare in the County of Somerset.
| Wigan Waterworks Act 1853 | 16 & 17 Vict. c. lxvii | 28 June 1853 |
An Act for supplying the Borough of Wigan in the County Palatine of Lancaster with Water, for the better Regulation of the Police therein, and for other Purposes.
| Belfast and Ballymena Extension Railway Act 1853 | 16 & 17 Vict. c. lxviii | 28 June 1853 |
An Act to enable the Belfast and Ballymena Railway Company to make a Railway from Randalstown to Cookstown; and for other Purposes.
| North and South Western Junction Railway Act 1853 | 16 & 17 Vict. c. lxix | 28 June 1853 |
An Act for enabling the North and South Western Junction Railway Company to construct a Branch to near Hammersmith, and to raise additional Capital; and for other Purposes.
| Thames Haven Dock and Railway Act 1853 (repealed) | 16 & 17 Vict. c. lxx | 28 June 1853 |
An Act to authorize the Abandonment of a Portion of the Undertaking of the Thames Haven Dock and Railway Company, and to reduce the Capital of the said Company, and to enable the Company to sell Lands not required; and for other Purposes. (Repealed by Thames Haven Dock Company's Act 1856 (19 & 20 Vict. c. cxix))
| Black Dog Road Act 1853 | 16 & 17 Vict. c. lxxi | 28 June 1853 |
An Act for more effectually repairing the Roads from Warminster and from Frame to the Bath Road, and other Roads connected therewith, in the Counties of Wilts and Somerset, called or known by the Name of "The Black Dog Road Trust."
| Stafford Shire Hall Act 1853 (repealed) | 16 & 17 Vict. c. lxxii | 28 June 1853 |
An Act for enlarging and improving the Shire Hall of the County of Stafford; removing the Markets at the Back of the Hall, and providing other Market Accommodation in lieu thereof; erecting Rooms and Offices for the Town Council of Stafford; and for other Purposes. (Repealed by Staffordshire Act 1983 (c. xviii))
| Limerick Corporation Act 1853 | 16 & 17 Vict. c. lxxiii | 28 June 1853 |
An Act to amend the Acts for the Regulation of Municipal Corporations in Ireland so far as relates to the Borough of Limerick.
| Leeds and Whitehall Turnpike Roads Act 1853 | 16 & 17 Vict. c. lxxiv | 28 June 1853 |
An Act to amend and extend the Provisions of the Act (Note: Road from Leeds to Whitehall (Yorkshire) Act 1825 (6 Geo. 4. c. xcvii)) relating to the Leeds and Whitehall Turnpike Roads, and to create a further Term therein, and for other Purposes.
| Adel Reservoirs Act 1853 | 16 & 17 Vict. c. lxxv | 28 June 1853 |
An Act for repairing, maintaining, and rendering more safe certain Reservoirs on the Adel Beck in the West Riding of the County of York.
| Sunderland Dock Amendment Act 1853 (repealed) | 16 & 17 Vict. c. lxxvi | 28 June 1853 |
An Act to amend "The Sunderland Dock Act, 1846," (Note: Sunderland Dock Act 1846 (9 & 10 Vict. c. xiii)) and "The Sunderland Dock Amendment Act, 1849," (Note: Sunderland Dock Amendment Act 1849 (12 & 13 Vict. c. xxxi)) and for other Purposes. (Repealed by Sunderland Dock Act 1855 (18 & 19 Vict. c. cxxviii))
| Leominster Markets and Fairs Act 1853 | 16 & 17 Vict. c. lxxvii | 28 June 1853 |
An Act for the Establishment or Improvement and Regulation of Markets and Fairs in the Borough of Leominster, and for other Purposes relating to the said Borough.
| Peebles Railway Act 1853 | 16 & 17 Vict. c. lxxviii | 8 July 1853 |
An Act for making a Railway from the Hawick Branch of the North British Railway, near to the Eskbank Station, to the Royal Burgh of Peebles.
| Londonderry and Coleraine Railway Act 1853 | 16 & 17 Vict. c. lxxix | 8 July 1853 |
An Act to authorize an Extension of the Londonderry and Coleraine Railway.
| Ballymena and Portrush Railway Act 1853 | 16 & 17 Vict. c. lxxx | 8 July 1853 |
An Act for making a Railway from Ballymena to Portrush.
| North British Railway (Finance) Act 1853 (repealed) | 16 & 17 Vict. c. lxxxi | 8 July 1853 |
An Act to confirm certain Preference Shares created by the North British Railway Company, and to make better Provision for the Payment of the Debts of the said Company, and for other Purposes. (Repealed by North British Railway Consolidation Act 1858 (21 & 22 Vict. c. cix))
| Scottish Midland Junction Railway Branches and Amendment Act 1853 | 16 & 17 Vict. c. lxxxii | 8 July 1853 |
An Act to enable the Scottish Midland Junction Railway Company to make Branch Railways to Blairgowrie and Kirriemuir; and to amend the Acts relating to such Company; and for other Purposes.
| South Shields Improvement Act 1853 (repealed) | 16 & 17 Vict. c. lxxxiii | 8 July 1853 |
An Act for the better Improvement and Regulation of the Borough of South Shields in the County of Durham, the Establishment of a Cemetery therein, and for other Purposes. (Repealed by Tyne and Wear Act 1980 (c. xliii))
| Bristol United Gaslight Company's Act 1853 | 16 & 17 Vict. c. lxxxiv | 8 July 1853 |
An Act to unite into One Company the Bristol Gaslight Company and the Bristol and Clifton Gaslight Company, and to enable the united Companies to raise further Capital.
| Staines, Wokingham, and Woking Railway Act 1853 | 16 & 17 Vict. c. lxxxv | 8 July 1853 |
An Act for making a Railway from Staines to Wokingham and Woking.
| Wimbledon and Croydon Railway Act 1853 | 16 & 17 Vict. c. lxxxvi | 8 July 1853 |
An Act for making a Railway from Wimbledon to Croydon in the County of Surrey, to be called "The Wimbledon and Croydon Railway," and for other Purposes.
| Eastern Counties Railway (Woodford and Loughton Branch) Act 1853 (repealed) | 16 & 17 Vict. c. lxxxvii | 8 July 1853 |
An Act to enable the Eastern Counties Railway Company to construct a Railway from the Line of the Northern and Eastern Railway near Stratford to Woodford and Loughton; and to repeal certain Provisions of their existing Acts; and to grant further Powers to the said Company for capitalizing their Debt; and for other Purposes. (Repealed by Great Eastern Railway Act 1862 (25 & 26 Vict. c. ccxxiii))
| East Grinstead Railway Act 1853 | 16 & 17 Vict. c. lxxxviii | 8 July 1853 |
An Act for making a Railway from the London, Brighton, and South Coast Railway to or near to the Town of East Grinstead in the County of Sussex.
| Haslingden and Rawtenstall Waterworks Act 1853 | 16 & 17 Vict. c. lxxxix | 8 July 1853 |
An Act for better supplying with Water the Towns and Villages of Haslingden, Rawtenstall, and Newchurch, and the Townships of Haslingden, Higher Booths, Lower Booths, Newchurch, and Hapton, in the Parish of Whalley, the Townships of Cowpe Lench, New Hall Hey and Hall Carr, and Tottington Higher End, in the Parish of Bury, and the Extra-parochial Places of Hen Heads and Dunnockshaw, all in the County Palatine of Lancaster.
| Monkland Railways Branches Act 1853 | 16 & 17 Vict. c. xc | 8 July 1853 |
An Act to enable the Monkland Railways Company to make certain Railways in the Vicinity of Bathgate and Airdrie; and for other Purposes.
| Manchester New Streets Act 1853 | 16 & 17 Vict. c. xci | 8 July 1853 |
An Act to authorize the Mayor, Aldermen, and Citizens of the City of Manchester to make certain new Streets; and to amend the Acts relating to the said City; and for other Purposes.
| Wimpole and Potton Turnpike Road Act 1853 | 16 & 17 Vict. c. xcii | 8 July 1853 |
An Act to repeal an Act of the Seventh Year of the Reign of King George the Fourth, (Note: Wimpole and Potton Road (Cambridgeshire, Bedfordshire) Act 1826 (7 Geo. 4. c. xxix)) for making and maintaining a Turnpike Road from Wimpole to Wrestlingworth and Potton, and to make other Provisions in lieu thereof.
| Hull and Holderness Railway Act 1853 | 16 & 17 Vict. c. xciii | 8 July 1853 |
An Act to incorporate a Company for making a Railway from Kingston-upon-Hull to or near to Withernsea in Holderness, with a Branch therefrom; and for other Purposes.
| Glasgow and South Western Railway Branch Act 1853 (repealed) | 16 & 17 Vict. c. xciv | 8 July 1853 |
An Act to enable the Glasgow and South-western Railway Company to make a Branch Railway to near Mayfield in the County of Ayr. (Repealed by Glasgow and South Western Railway Consolidation Act 1855 (18 & 19 Vict. c. xcvii))
| Rochester Bridge Amendment Act 1853 (repealed) | 16 & 17 Vict. c. xcv | 8 July 1853 |
An Act for extending the Time granted by "The Rochester Bridge Act, 1846," (Note: Rochester Bridge Act 1846 (9 & 10 Vict. c. vi)) for the Completion of such Bridge. (Repealed by Charities (The Rochester Bridge Trust) Order 2000 (SI 2000/3098))
| Limerick and Ennis Railway (Lease) Act 1853 | 16 & 17 Vict. c. xcvi | 8 July 1853 |
An Act to enable the Limerick, Ennis, and Killaloe Junction Railway Company to lease their Undertaking; and for other Purposes.
| North London Railway Act 1853 | 16 & 17 Vict. c. xcvii | 8 July 1853 |
An Act to enable the East and West India Docks and Birmingham Junction Railway Company to raise additional Capital; and for other Purposes.
| Gorbals Gravitation Water Company Act 1853 | 16 & 17 Vict. c. xcviii | 8 July 1853 |
An Act to amend the Gorbals Gravitation Water Company's Acts, to authorize the Extension of their Works to supply the Royal Burgh of Renfrew and Suburbs and other Places with Water, and for other Purposes.
| Portsmouth Railway Act 1853 | 16 & 17 Vict. c. xcix | 8 July 1853 |
An Act for making a Railway from Havant in the County of Southampton to Godalming in the County of Surrey, to be called "The Portsmouth Railway;" and for other Purposes.
| London, Brighton and South Coast Railway Act 1853 | 16 & 17 Vict. c. c | 8 July 1853 |
An Act to enable the London, Brighton, and South Coast Railway Company to enlarge their Station at London Bridge, and their Goods Station at Brighton, and to make a Branch Railway to the Crystal Palace; and for converting the Debenture Debt of the London, Brighton, and South Coast Railway Company into Stock or Shares; and for other Purposes.
| Aberdeen Railway Act 1853 | 16 & 17 Vict. c. ci | 8 July 1853 |
An Act to enable the Aberdeen Railway Company to raise further Monies; to authorize the Abandonment of the authorized Road to the Quays through the Station at Aberdeen, and the Formation of another Road in lieu thereof; to extend the time for the compulsory Purchase of Lands and for the Completion of the Aberdeen Station; to alter, amend, and extend tho Acts relating to the Company; and for other Purposes.
| Manchester and Bury New Turnpike Road Act 1853 | 16 & 17 Vict. c. cii | 8 July 1853 |
An Act to repeal an Act for making and maintaining a Road from the Top of Hunts Bank in the Town of Manchester in the County of Lancaster to join the Manchester and Bury Turnpike Road in Pilkington in the same County, and to substitute other Provisions in lieu thereof.
| Witham Drainage Second District Act 1853 | 16 & 17 Vict. c. ciii | 8 July 1853 |
An Act for amending the Provisions with respect to the Commissioners of the Second District for Drainage by the River Witham contained in the Witham Drainage Act of the Second Year of George the Third, Chapter Thirty-two, (Note: Witham Drainage Act 1762 (2 Geo. 3. c. 32)) and for other Purposes, and of which the Short Title is "The Witham Drainage Second District Act, 1853."
| Burford, Lechdale and Swindon Turnpike Roads Act 1853 (repealed) | 16 & 17 Vict. c. civ | 4 August 1853 |
An Act for more effectually repairing and maintaining the Road from Burford in the County of Oxford to Leachlade in the County of Gloucester, the Road from thence through Highworth to the Crichlade and Swindon Turnpike Road in the County of Wilts, and the Bridge on the said Roads across the River Isis or Thames at or near the Town of Leachlade aforesaid; and for granting a further Term in the said Roads and Bridge; and for other Purposes. (Repealed by Statute Law (Repeals) Act 2013 (c. 2))
| Shipley and Bramley Turnpike Road Act 1853 (repealed) | 16 & 17 Vict. c. cv | 4 August 1853 |
An Act to amend an Act passed in the Seventh Year of the Reign of King George the Fourth intituled "An Act for making a Turnpike Road from Shipley to Bramley, together with certain Branches therefrom, in the West Riding of the County of York." (Note: Shipley and Bramley Road (Yorkshire) Act 1826 (7 Geo. 4. c. cxxix)) (Repealed by Annual Turnpike Acts Continuance Act 1872 (35 & 36 Vict. c. 85))
| London Docks Act 1853 (repealed) | 16 & 17 Vict. c. cvi | 4 August 1853 |
An Act to authorize the London Dock Company to make a new Entrance to their Docks from the River Thames and other Works, and to augment their Capital Stock; and for other Purposes connected with the said Docks. (Repealed by London and Saint Katharine Docks Act 1864 (27 & 28 Vict. c. clxxviii))
| Barnsley Waterworks Act 1853 | 16 & 17 Vict. c. cvii | 4 August 1853 |
An Act for the Maintenance of the existing Works of the Company of Proprietors of the Barnsley Waterworks, and for the Purchase of Lands by them; to repeal their Act, (Note: Barnsley Water Act 1837 (7 Will. 4 & 1 Vict. c. lxxxii)) and make other Provisions in lieu thereof.
| Midland Railway (Leicester and Hitchin) Act 1853 | 16 & 17 Vict. c. cviii | 4 August 1853 |
An Act to enable the Midland Railway Company to make a Line of Railway from near Leicester to the Great Northern Railway near Hitchin, with a Branch, in lieu of the Line of Railway and Branches authorized by "The Midland Railways Extension to Hitchin, Northampton, and Huntingdon Railway Act, 1847," (Note: Midland Railways (Extension to Hitchin, Northampton and Huntingdon Railway) Act 1847 (10 & 11 Vict. c. cxxxv)) and "The Midland Railways Extension to Hitchin, Northampton, and Huntingdon Railway (Wellingborough Deviations) Act, 1848." (Note: Midland Railway's Extension to Hitchin, Northampton and Huntingdon Railway (Wellingborough Deviations) Act 1848 (11 & 12 Vict. c. xxi))
| York and North Midland Railway Act 1853 | 16 & 17 Vict. c. cix | 4 August 1853 |
An Act to authorize the Re-issue of certain of the Shares in the Capital of the York and North Midland Railway Company, called Hull and Selby Purchase, &c. Shares, and for other Purposes.
| London and North Western Railway (Haydon Square Depôt) Act 1853 | 16 & 17 Vict. c. cx | 4 August 1853 |
An Act to enable the London and North-western Railway Company to acquire and hold certain Lands and Buildings at or near the Terminus of the Haydon Square Branch of the London and Blackwall Railway; and for other Purposes.
| Leeds, Bradford and Halifax Junction Railway Act 1853 | 16 & 17 Vict. c. cxi | 4 August 1853 |
An Act to enable the Leeds, Bradford, and Halifax Junction Railway Company to construct certain Branch Railways in the West Riding of the County of York; and for other Purposes.
| Alston Road Act 1853 | 16 & 17 Vict. c. cxii | 4 August 1853 |
An Act to repeal the Act (Note: Durham, Cumberland, Northumberland and North Yorkshire Roads and Tyne Bridges Act 1824 (5 Geo. 4. c. xxxiv)) for repairing the Alston Turnpike Roads, and to make other Provisions in lieu thereof.
| Roscrea and Parsonstown Junction Railway Act 1853 | 16 & 17 Vict. c. cxiii | 4 August 1853 |
An Act for making a Railway from the Great Southern and Western Railway near Roscrea to Parsonstown, to be called "The Roscrea and Parsonstown Junction Railway," and for other Purposes.
| Limerick and Ennis Railway Act 1853 | 16 & 17 Vict. c. cxiv | 4 August 1853 |
An Act to authorize the Abandonment of a Portion of the Undertaking of the Limerick, Ennis, and Killaloe Junction Railway Company, and the Construction of a new Line of Railway in lieu of a Portion of the Line to be abandoned; and to revive in respect of a Portion of the said Undertaking the Powers of the said Company for the compulsory Purchase of Lands, and to extend in respect of the same Portion of the said Undertaking the Powers of the said Company for constructing Works; and to amend and repeal Portions of the Act (Note: Limerick, Ennis and Killaloe Junction Railway Act 1846 (9 & 10 Vict. c. cxcv)) relating to the said Company; and for other Purposes.
| Wildmore Fen and East and West Fens Highways Act 1853 | 16 & 17 Vict. c. cxv | 4 August 1853 |
An Act for the better Maintenance and Repair of the Highways in Wildmore Fen and the East and West Fens in the County of Lincoln, and for other Purposes, and of which the Short Title is "The Wildmore Fen and East and West Fens Highways Act, 1853."
| South Eastern Railway (London Bridge Station, &c.) Act 1853 | 16 & 17 Vict. c. cxvi | 4 August 1853 |
An Act for reviving the Powers of the South-eastern Railway Company for taking Lands and Buildings for the Purpose of enlarging their London Bridge Station on the North Side thereof, and for extending for a further Period such Powers, and for other Purposes.
| Eastern Counties Railway (North Woolwich Railway Branches) Act 1853 (repealed) | 16 & 17 Vict. c. cxvii | 4 August 1853 |
An Act to enable the Eastern Counties Railway Company to construct Branch Railways from the North Woolwich Line of the Eastern Counties Railway to Ham Creek and the River Thames; and for other Purposes. (Repealed by Great Eastern Railway Act 1862 (25 & 26 Vict. c. ccxxiii))
| Town of Burton-upon-Trent Act 1853 | 16 & 17 Vict. c. cxviii | 4 August 1853 |
An Act for more effectually improving the Town of Burton-upon-Trent in the County of Stafford.
| Port Carlisle Dock and Railway Act 1853 | 16 & 17 Vict. c. cxix | 4 August 1853 |
An Act to authorize the Abandonment of the Carlisle Canal, and the making of a Railway in lieu thereof, from the Newcastle-upon-Tyne and Carlisle Railway at Carlisle to Port Carlisle; to repeal the Acts relating to the Carlisle Canal and Docks, and to re-incorporate the Company; to authorize the raising of a further Sum of Money; and to confer additional Powers; and for other Purposes.
| Governor and Company of Copper Miners Act 1853 | 16 & 17 Vict. c. cxx | 4 August 1853 |
An Act to alter and amend the Provisions of "The Governor and Company of Copper Miners Act, 1851," (Note: Governor and Company of Copper Miners Act 1851 (14 & 15 Vict. c. cv)) and to confer further Powers on the said Company.
| South-eastern Railway (Reading Extension) Act 1853 | 16 & 17 Vict. c. cxxi | 4 August 1853 |
An Act to enable the South-eastern Railway Company to extend the Reading, Guildford, and Reigate Railway to the Great Western Railway at Reading; and for other Purposes.
| Warrington and Stockport Railway Act 1853 | 16 & 17 Vict. c. cxxii | 4 August 1853 |
An Act to enable the Warrington and Altrincham Junction Railway Company to extend their Railway to Stockport.
| Electric Telegraph Company of Ireland Act 1853 | 16 & 17 Vict. c. cxxiii | 4 August 1853 |
An Act for incorporating and regulating the Electric Telegraph Company of Ireland, and for better enabling the Company to establish and work Telegraphs in Scotland and Ireland and between those Countries; and for other Purposes.
| Norwich and Spalding Railway Act 1853 | 16 & 17 Vict. c. cxxiv | 4 August 1853 |
An Act for making a Railway from Spalding to Sutton Bridge and Wisbeach.
| Forth and Clyde Junction Railway Act 1853 | 16 & 17 Vict. c. cxxv | 4 August 1853 |
An Act for making a Railway commencing by a Junction with the Scottish Central Railway at Stirling, and terminating by a Junction with the Caledonian and Dumbartonshire Junction Railway at Alexandria, to be called "The Forth and Clyde Junction Railway."
| Upton St. Leonard's Turnpike Roads Act 1853 (repealed) | 16 & 17 Vict. c. cxxvi | 4 August 1853 |
An Act for making Turnpike Roads from Upton Saint Leonard's to Brimpsfield and Birdlip in the County of Gloucester. (Repealed by Statute Law (Repeals) Act 2013 (c. 2))
| Dewsbury Waterworks Act 1853 (repealed) | 16 & 17 Vict. c. cxxvii | 4 August 1853 |
An Act for enabling the Local Board of Health for the District of Dewsbury to construct Waterworks; and for other Purposes. (Repealed by Dewsbury, Batley and Heckmondwike Waterworks Act 1856 (19 & 20 Vict. c. xxxvi))
| Wakefield and Sheffield Roads Act 1853 | 16 & 17 Vict. c. cxxviii | 4 August 1853 |
An Act to authorize the opening of a Diversion of the Wakefield and Sheffield Turnpike Road, and for other Purposes.
| St. Ives Harbour Act 1853 | 16 & 17 Vict. c. cxxix | 4 August 1853 |
An Act for the Improvement of the Harbour of Saint Ives in the County of Cornwall.
| South-eastern Railway (Strood to Maidstone) Act 1853 | 16 & 17 Vict. c. cxxx | 4 August 1853 |
An Act to enable the South-eastern Railway Company to make a Railway from Strood to Maidstone; and for other Purposes.
| Victoria (London) Docks Act 1853 | 16 & 17 Vict. c. cxxxi | 4 August 1853 |
An Act to authorize the Construction of additional Docks and other Works in connexion with the Victoria (London) Docks, and to consolidate and amend the Provisions of the Act (Note: Victoria London Dock Act 1850 (13 & 14 Vict. c. li)) relating to such Docks.
| East Kent Railway Act 1853 | 16 & 17 Vict. c. cxxxii | 4 August 1853 |
An Act for making a Railway from Strood to Canterbury, with Branches to Faversham Quays and Chilham.
| South Staffordshire Waterworks Act 1853 | 16 & 17 Vict. c. cxxxiii | 4 August 1853 |
An Act for supplying with Water the Inhabitants of Walsall, Dudley, and other Places in the Southern Parts of the County of Stafford, and in certain Parts of the County of Worcester adjacent thereto.
| St. Helen's Canal and Railway Act 1853 | 16 & 17 Vict. c. cxxxiv | 4 August 1853 |
An Act to enable the St. Helen's Canal and Railway Company to extend their Railway to Rainford, and to enlarge their Stations at Sutton; and for other Purposes relating to the Company.
| Pendleton Roads Act 1853 | 16 & 17 Vict. c. cxxxv | 4 August 1853 |
An Act for more effectually repairing and improving several Roads leading to and from the Town of Salford through Pendleton and other Places in the County Palatine of Lancaster.
| Leeds Northern Railway Act 1853 | 16 & 17 Vict. c. cxxxvi | 4 August 1853 |
An Act for enabling the Leeds Northern Railway Company to create new Shares, and raise Money on Loan for discharging certain Liabilities; and for other Purposes.
| Bedale and Leyburn Railway Act 1853 | 16 & 17 Vict. c. cxxxvii | 4 August 1853 |
An Act for making a Railway from Bedale to Leyburn in the North Riding of the County of York, to be called "The Bedale and Leyburn Railway," and for other Purposes, and of which the Short Title is "The Bedale and Leyburn Railway Act, 1853."
| Holme Reservoirs Act 1853 | 16 & 17 Vict. c. cxxxviii | 4 August 1853 |
An Act for the Adjustment of the Debts of the Commissioners of the Holme Reservoirs, and of the Interest due thereon, and for enabling them to restore and repair their Reservoirs; and for other Purposes.
| Spalding Improvement Act 1853 (repealed) | 16 & 17 Vict. c. cxxxix | 4 August 1853 |
An Act for paving, lighting, watching, draining, supplying with Water, cleansing, regulating, and otherwise improving the Town and Parish of Spalding in the County of Lincoln; for making a Cemetery; for erecting a Corn Exchange and Market House therein; and for other Purposes. (Repealed by South Lincolnshire Water Board Order 1964 (SI 1964/1746))
| Bideford Extension Railway Act 1853 | 16 & 17 Vict. c. cxl | 4 August 1853 |
An Act for making a Railway from the North Devon Railway at Fremington Pill to Bideford, to be called "The Bideford Extension Railway."
| Whitechapel Improvement Act 1853 | 16 & 17 Vict. c. cxli | 4 August 1853 |
An Act for the better paving, repairing, lighting, cleansing, watering, regulating, and improving such Parts of the Parish of Saint Mary Whitechapel in the County of Middlesex as are not within the Liberties of Her Majesty's Tower of London and the City of London; and for paving, repairing, watering, and regulating certain Parts of other Parishes and Places adjoining; and for removing and preventing Nuisances, Annoyances, and Obstructions therein; and for raising Money for the Relief, Maintenance, and Employment of the Poor within the said Parish; and for raising Money for repairing the Church of the said Parish.
| Great Southern and Western Railway (Ireland) Act 1853 | 16 & 17 Vict. c. cxlii | 4 August 1853 |
An Act to enable the Great Southern and Western Railway Company to divert the Glanmire Road Lower in the Parish of Saint Anne's Shandon in the County of the City or Borough of Cork, and to make a small Portion of Railway in that Parish; and for other Purposes.
| Llanidloes and Newtown Railways Act 1853 | 16 & 17 Vict. c. cxliii | 4 August 1853 |
An Act for making a Railway from Llanidloes in the County of Montgomery to Newtown in the same County, to be called the Llanidloes and Newtown Railway; and for other Purposes.
| Waveney Valley Railway Extension Act 1853 (repealed) | 16 & 17 Vict. c. cxliv | 4 August 1853 |
An Act to enable the Waveney Valley Railway Company to extend their Railway from Bungay to Beccles. (Repealed by Great Eastern Railway Act 1862 (25 & 26 Vict. c. ccxxiii))
| Manchester, Sheffield and Lincolnshire Railway (Barnsley Branch Extension) Act 1853 | 16 & 17 Vict. c. cxlv | 4 August 1853 |
An Act for altering and extending the Line of the Barnsley Branch of the Manchester, Sheffield, and Lincolnshire Railway Company; for extending the Time for the Completion of certain Works at Sheffield; for amending the Acts relating to the said Company; and for other Purposes.
| Llynvi Valley Railway Act 1853 (repealed) | 16 & 17 Vict. c. cxlvi | 4 August 1853 |
An Act for amending the Acts relating to the "Llynvi Valley Railway Company," and for authorizing the Company to make Diversions in and improve their Line of Railway and construct a new Branch, and for better regulating the Harbour of Porth Cawl and the Rates leviable thereat; and for other Purposes. (Repealed by Llynvi Valley Railway Act 1855 (18 & 19 Vict. c. l))
| Nantwich and Woore Road Act 1853 | 16 & 17 Vict. c. cxlvii | 4 August 1853 |
An Act to repeal the Act (Note: Stafford and Clotton Road Act 1824 (5 Geo. 4. c. xxxvi)) relating to the Nantwich and Woore Turnpike Road, and to make other Provisions in lieu thereof.
| Ayr and Dalmellington Railway Act 1853 | 16 & 17 Vict. c. cxlviii | 4 August 1853 |
An Act to authorize the Extension of the Railway already partly executed between Smithstown and Dalmellington in the County of Ayr to Dalmellington, and to the Glasgow and South-western Railway near Ayr.
| Caledonian Railway (Crofthead Extension and Amendment) Act 1853 | 16 & 17 Vict. c. cxlix | 4 August 1853 |
An Act to enable the Caledonian Railway Company to extend the Glasgow, Barrhead, and Neilston Direct Railway to Crofthead; and for other Purposes.
| Furness Railway Act 1853 (repealed) | 16 & 17 Vict. c. cl | 4 August 1853 |
An Act for confirming a certain Agreement entered into between the Furness Railway Company and John Abel Smith Esquire, and for enabling the Furness Railway Company to raise a further Sum of Money, and for authorizing the Conversion of the borrowed and Preferential Share Capital of the Furness Railway Company into a Stock not exceeding Four Pounds Ten Shillings per Centum, and for amending the Acts relating to the said Company and Pile Pier. (Repealed by Furness Railway Act 1855 (18 & 19 Vict. c. clxxiii))
| Edinburgh and Glasgow Railway Branches Act 1853 | 16 & 17 Vict. c. cli | 4 August 1853 |
An Act to enable the Edinburgh and Glasgow Railway Company to connect their Line at Glasgow by Branches with the Caledonian Railway, and to extend their Station at Cowlairs.
| Edinburgh, Perth and Dundee Railway Company's Arrangements Act 1853 | 16 & 17 Vict. c. clii | 4 August 1853 |
An Act to sanction certain Arrangements between the Edinburgh, Perth, and Dundee Railway Company, and certain Classes of the Creditors thereof.
| Great Western Railway Branches Act 1853 | 16 & 17 Vict. c. cliii | 4 August 1853 |
An Act for enabling the Great Western Railway Company to construct additional Lines and Works, or for conferring further Powers on them in reference to the Henley and Uxbridge Lines, and other Parts of their Undertaking at Acton, Chippenham, and Reading; and for other Purposes.
| Lands Improvement Company's Act 1853 | 16 & 17 Vict. c. cliv | 4 August 1853 |
An Act for incorporating the Lands Improvement Company, and to afford Facilities for the Improvement of Land by enabling the Company to issue transferable Mortgage Debentures.
| Saint Ives and West Cornwall Junction Railway Act 1853 (repealed) | 16 & 17 Vict. c. clv | 4 August 1853 |
An Act for making a Railway from the Town of Saint Ives to the West Cornwall Railway at or near Saint Erth, with a Branch therefrom, and for making Arrangements with the West Cornwall Railway Company. (Repealed by Statute Law (Repeals) Act 2013 (c. 2))
| South Eastern Railway (Canterbury and Whitstable and Steam Packets) Act 1853 | 16 & 17 Vict. c. clvi | 4 August 1853 |
An Act for dissolving the Canterbury and Whitstable Railway Company, and for vesting in the South-eastern Railway Company the Undertaking of the South-eastern and Continental Steam Packet Company, and for other Purposes, and of which the Short Title is "The South-eastern Railway (Canterbury and Whitstable and Steam Packets) Act, 1853."
| London and North Western Railway (Oldham Branch Deviation, &c.) Act 1853 | 16 & 17 Vict. c. clvii | 4 August 1853 |
An Act for conferring additional Powers on the London and North-western Railway Company with reference to the Construction of their Oldham Branch, and for making an Alteration in such Branch; and for other Purposes.
| New Ross Free Bridge Act 1853 | 16 & 17 Vict. c. clviii | 4 August 1853 |
An Act for the Purchase of the Bridge and Ferry over the River of Ross at the Town of New Ross, and for maintaining the same free of Toll, and for other Purposes.
| British Electric Telegraph Company's Act 1853 | 16 & 17 Vict. c. clix | 4 August 1853 |
An Act for repealing and amending an Act passed in the Thirteenth and Fourteenth Years of the Reign of Her present Majesty, called "The British Electric Telegraph Company's Act, 1850." (Note: British Electric Telegraph Company's Act 1850 (13 & 14 Vict. c. lxxxvi))
| London and North Western Railway (Northampton and Market Harborough, &c. Branches) Act 1853 | 16 & 17 Vict. c. clx | 4 August 1853 |
An Act to enable the London and North-western Railway Company to construct a Railway from Northampton to Market Harborough, with a Branch therefrom, all in the County of Northampton; and for other Purposes.
| London and North Western Railway (St. Alban's Branch) Act 1853 | 16 & 17 Vict. c. clxi | 4 August 1853 |
An Act to enable the London and North-western Railway Company to construct a Branch Railway to Saint Albans, and for other Purposes.
| West Harptree Road Act 1853 | 16 & 17 Vict. c. clxii | 4 August 1853 |
An Act to repeal the Acts for repairing the Roads from West Harptry to the Bath and Wells Turnpike Road at Marksbury, and other Roads therein mentioned, in the County of Somerset, and to make other Provisions in lieu thereof.
| East Lancashire Railway Act 1853 | 16 & 17 Vict. c. clxiii | 4 August 1853 |
An Act to enable the East Lancashire Railway Company to extend their Railway to Rainford, to enter into Arrangements with the St. Helen's Canal and Railway Company, and to convert their Mortgage Debt into Annuities.
| London and South Western Railway (Basingstoke and Salisbury) Act 1853 | 16 & 17 Vict. c. clxiv | 4 August 1853 |
An Act for amending the Acts passed for the Construction of the Basingstoke and Salisbury Railway, and for other Purposes, and of which the Short Title is "The London and South-western Railway (Basingstoke and Salisbury) Act, 1853."
| Birkenhead Docks Trustees Act 1853 (repealed) | 16 & 17 Vict. c. clxv | 4 August 1853 |
An Act for authorizing Arrangements for the Completion of the Birkenhead Docks. (Repealed by Mersey Dock Acts Consolidation Act 1858 (21 & 22 Vict. c. xcii))
| East London Waterworks Act 1853 or the Eastern London Waterworks Act 1853 | 16 & 17 Vict. c. clxvi | 4 August 1853 |
An Act for enabling the East London Waterworks Company to improve their Supply of Water; and for other Purposes.
| Halifax Improvement Act 1853 | 16 & 17 Vict. c. clxvii | 4 August 1853 |
An Act for the Improvement of the Borough of Halifax, and for other Purposes, and of which the Short Title is "The Halifax Improvement Act, 1853."
| Limerick and Foynes Railway Act 1853 | 16 & 17 Vict. c. clxviii | 4 August 1853 |
An Act for making a Railway from Limerick to Foynes.
| Llanelly Railway and Dock Act 1853 | 16 & 17 Vict. c. clxix | 4 August 1853 |
An Act for enabling the Llanelly Railway and Dock Company to make new Railways, and for other Purposes, and of which the Short Title is "The Llanelly Railway and Dock Act, 1853."
| Ribble Navigation Act 1853 (repealed) | 16 & 17 Vict. c. clxx | 4 August 1853 |
An Act to repeal the Acts relating to the Ribble Navigation Company, of the First Year of the Reign of Her present Majesty, Chapter Eight, (Note: River Ribble Navigation Act 1838 (1 & 2 Vict. c. viii)) and of the Seventh Year of the Reign of Her present Majesty, Chapter One, (Note: Ribble Navigation Company Act 1844 (7 & 8 Vict. c. i)) and some of the Provisions of the Act of the Eighth and Ninth Years of the Reign of Her present Majesty, Chapter One hundred and sixteen, (Note: North Union and Ribble Navigation Branch Railway Act 1845 (8 & 9 Vict. c. cxvi)) which relate to the Company, and to make other Provisions in lieu thereof respectively; and to grant further Powers to the Company for the Construction of Works, for providing Quays, for raising Capital, for levying Tolls, for regulating the Disposition of the reclaimed Lands, and for other Purposes. (Repealed by Preston Corporation Act 1964 (c. xviii))
| Whitehaven and Furness Junction Railway Amendment Act 1853 (repealed) | 16 & 17 Vict. c. clxxi | 4 August 1853 |
An Act to enable the Whitehaven and Furness Junction Railway Company to make Branch Railways; and for other Purposes. (Repealed by Whitehaven and Furness Junction Railway Act 1857 (20 & 21 Vict. c.cxxii))
| Blyth and Tyne Railway Branches Act 1853 | 16 & 17 Vict. c. clxxii | 4 August 1853 |
An Act to enable the Blyth and Tyne Railway Company to construct Branches in the County of Northumberland; and for other Purposes.
| Milford Haven Docks Act 1853 | 16 & 17 Vict. c. clxxiii | 4 August 1853 |
An Act for constructing and maintaining Docks and other Works at or near to Milford Haven, and for other Purposes.
| Londonderry, Enniskillen and Sligo Railway Act 1853 | 16 & 17 Vict. c. clxxiv | 4 August 1853 |
An Act for making a Railway from Enniskillen to Sligo, with a Branch therefrom.
| Birmingham and Oxford, Birmingham, Dudley and Wolverhampton, and Great Western Railways Act 1853 | 16 & 17 Vict. c. clxxv | 4 August 1853 |
An Act for providing additional Station Accommodation at Birmingham in connexion with the Birmingham and Oxford Junction Railway; and for enabling the Great Western Railway Company to use a Portion of the Oxford, Worcester, and Wolverhampton Railway; and for making better Provision with reference to the joint Station at Wolverhampton; and for other Purposes.
| Westminster Improvement Act 1853 | 16 & 17 Vict. c. clxxvi | 4 August 1853 |
An Act to amend and enlarge the Powers and Provisions of "The Westminster Improvement Act, 1845," (Note: Westminster Improvement Act 1845 (8 & 9 Vict. c. clxxviii)) "The Westminster Improvement Act, 1847," (Note: Westminster Improvement Act 1847 (10 & 11 Vict. c. cxxxi)) and "The Westminster Improvement Act, 1850;" (Note: Westminster Improvement Act 1850 (13 & 14 Vict. c. cii)) to extend the Time for the compulsory Purchase of Lands; to authorize further Improvements in the City of Westminster; and for other Purposes.
| Birkenhead Dock Company's Act 1853 (repealed) | 16 & 17 Vict. c. clxxvii | 4 August 1853 |
An Act to amend the Acts relating to the Birkenhead Dock Company, and to enable the Company to make a Railway for their Works, and for other Purposes, and of which the Short Title is "The Birkenhead Dock Company's Act, 1853." (Repealed by Mersey Dock Acts Consolidation Act 1858 (21 & 22 Vict. c. xcii))
| Newport, Abergavenny and Hereford Railway (Taff Vale Extension) Act 1853 | 16 & 17 Vict. c. clxxviii | 4 August 1853 |
An Act to authorize the Newport, Abergavenny, and Hereford Railway Company to make Deviations on their Extension to the Taff Vale Railway, and to make certain short Branches.
| Newport, Abergavenny and Hereford Railway (Deviation at Hereford) Act 1853 | 16 & 17 Vict. c. clxxix | 4 August 1853 |
An Act to authorize Deviations at Hereford and near Pontypool of the Newport, Abergavenny, and Hereford Railway, and to amend the Acts relating to that Railway.
| West London and Crystal Palace Railway Act 1853 | 16 & 17 Vict. c. clxxx | 4 August 1853 |
An Act for making a Railway to the Crystal Palace, with Branches to the London, Brighton, and South Coast Railway, and to the London and South-western Railway.
| Chorley Improvement Act 1853 | 16 & 17 Vict. c. clxxxi | 4 August 1853 |
An Act for the Improvement of the Parish of Charley in the County of Lancaster.
| Newcastle-upon-Tyne Improvement Act 1853 | 16 & 17 Vict. c. clxxxii | 4 August 1853 |
An Act for the more effectual Improvement of the Borough of Newcastle-upon-Tyne.
| Newry and Enniskillen Railway Amendment Act 1853 (repealed) | 16 & 17 Vict. c. clxxxiii | 4 August 1853 |
An Act to enable the Newry and Enniskillen Railway Company to extend their Railway to the Landing Quay at Newry, to effect a Junction with the Dublin and Belfast Junction Railway, and for other Purposes. (Repealed by Newry and Enniskillen Railway Amendment and Extension Act 1857 (20 & 21 Vict. c. clvi))
| Worcester and Hereford Railway Act 1853 | 16 & 17 Vict. c. clxxxiv | 15 August 1853 |
An Act for making a Railway from Worcester to Hereford, with certain Branches therefrom, and for other Purposes.
| Westport Portland Harbour Act 1853 | 16 & 17 Vict. c. clxxxv | 15 August 1853 |
An Act for improving and maintaining the Port and Harbour of Westport in the County of Mayo.
| North Metropolitan Railway Act 1853 (repealed) | 16 & 17 Vict. c. clxxxvi | 15 August 1853 |
An Act for making a Railway from the North-western District of the Metropolis to Battle Bridge in the County of Middlesex. (Repealed by Metropolitan Railway Act 1854 (17 & 18 Vict. c. ccxxi))
| West Cornwall Railway Amendment Act 1853 | 16 & 17 Vict. c. clxxxvii | 15 August 1853 |
An Act to enable the West Cornwall Railway Company to make certain new Railways; and for other Purposes.
| Crieff Junction Railway Act 1853 | 16 & 17 Vict. c. clxxxviii | 15 August 1853 |
An Act for making a Railway from the Scottish Central Railway near Loaninghead to the Town of Crieff.
| Tralee and Killarney Railway Act 1853 | 16 & 17 Vict. c. clxxxix | 15 August 1853 |
An Act for making a Railway from Tralee to Killarney.
| Imperial Continental Gas Association Act 1853 (repealed) | 16 & 17 Vict. c. cxc | 15 August 1853 |
An Act for consolidating and amending the Powers of the Acts of "The Imperial Continental Gas Association." (Repealed by Imperial Continental Gas Association Act 1870 (33 & 34 Vict. c. lxx))
| Castlemaine Estuary Reclamation Act 1853 | 16 & 17 Vict. c. cxci | 15 August 1853 |
An Act for reclaiming, inclosing, and appropriating certain Parts of the Harbour or Estuary of Castlemaine and the Creeks of Caragh and Rossbehy in the County of Kerry.
| Chard Railway Act 1853 | 16 & 17 Vict. c. cxcii | 15 August 1853 |
An Act to revive and amend the Powers of the Acts relating to the Chard Railway Company, to regulate the Capital of the Company, and to enable them to extend their authorized Railway into Taunton.
| East Anglian Railways Act 1853 (repealed) | 16 & 17 Vict. c. cxciii | 15 August 1853 |
An Act for constructing a Railway and Landing Places within the Borough of King's Lynn, for regulating the Share Capital of the East Anglian Railways Company, and for other Purposes, and of which the Short Title is "The East Anglian Railways Act, 1853." (Repealed by Great Eastern Railway Act 1862 (25 & 26 Vict. c. ccxxiii))
| Limerick Improvement Act 1853 | 16 & 17 Vict. c. cxciv | 15 August 1853 |
An Act for the Improvement of the Borough of Limerick.
| Monmouthshire Railway and Canal Act 1853 | 16 & 17 Vict. c. cxcv | 15 August 1853 |
An Act for enabling the Monmouthshire Railway and Canal Company to make new Railways; and for other Purposes.
| Severn and Wye Railway and Canal Act 1853 | 16 & 17 Vict. c. cxcvi | 15 August 1853 |
An Act to enable the Severn and Wye Railway and Canal Company to improve their Railway and Harbour; and for other Purposes relating to the Company.
| South Wales Mineral Railway Act 1853 | 16 & 17 Vict. c. cxcvii | 15 August 1853 |
An Act for making a Railway from the South Wales Railway at Britonferry to Glyncorrwg in Glamorganshire, to be called "The South Wales Mineral Railway."
| Staffordshire Potteries Waterworks Consolidation and Extension Act 1853 | 16 & 17 Vict. c. cxcviii | 15 August 1853 |
An Act to consolidate and amend "The Staffordshire Potteries Waterworks Act, 1847," (Note: Staffordshire Potteries Waterworks Act 1847 (10 & 11 Vict. c. cciv)) and "The Staffordshire Potteries Waterworks Extension Act, 1849," (Note: Staffordshire Potteries Waterworks Extension Act 1849 (12 & 13 Vict. c. xxxvi)) and to extend the Provisions and enlarge the Powers thereof.
| Stamford and Essendine Railway Act 1853 | 16 & 17 Vict. c. cxcix | 15 August 1853 |
An Act for making a Railway from Stamford Baron in the County of Northampton to the Great Northern Railway at Essendine in the County of Rutland, and for other Purposes connected therewith.
| Galway Town Improvement Act 1853 | 16 & 17 Vict. c. cc | 15 August 1853 |
An Act for better paving, draining, cleansing, lighting, watching, supplying with Water, regulating in regard to Markets and other Purposes, for making new Streets, and otherwise improving the Town of Galway.
| Richmond Burgage Pastures Act 1853 | 16 & 17 Vict. c. cci | 15 August 1853 |
An Act for regulating the depasturing and Management of certain Pastures in the Parish of Richmond in the County of York.
| Cork and Bandon Railway Act 1853 | 16 & 17 Vict. c. ccii | 15 August 1853 |
An Act to consolidate the Acts relating to the Cork and Bandon Railway Company, to authorize the Company to construct Extension and Branch Railways, and for other Purposes.
| Electric Telegraph Company's Act 1853 | 16 & 17 Vict. c. cciii | 15 August 1853 |
An Act for granting further Powers to "The Electric Telegraph Corapany," and to enable such Company to make Arrangements for the working of Telegraphs adjoining their Works.
| South Wales Railway (Deviation) Act 1853 (repealed) | 16 & 17 Vict. c. cciv | 20 August 1853 |
An Act for authorizing the South Wales Railway Company to deviate the Line of their Railway in the Forest of Dean, and for other Purposes. (Repealed by South Wales Railway Consolidation Act 1855 (18 & 19 Vict. c. xcviii))
| London and North Western Railway (Buckingham Extension) Act 1853 | 16 & 17 Vict. c. ccv | 20 August 1853 |
An Act to enable the London and North-western Railway Company to make a Railway to connect the Buckinghamshire Railway with the Oxford, Worcester, and Wolverhampton Railway.
| Harwich Dock and Pier Act 1853 (repealed) | 16 & 17 Vict. c. ccvi | 20 August 1853 |
An Act for reclaiming from the Sea certain Lands near Harwich, for constructing Docks and a Pier on such Lands, and for other Purposes. (Repealed by Harwich Parkeston Quay Act 1988 (c. xxviii))
| Galway Harbour and Port Act 1853 | 16 & 17 Vict. c. ccvii | 20 August 1853 |
An Act for making a Pier and Breakwater in the Bay of Galway, and for conferring additional Powers on the Galway Harbour Commissioners, and for other Purposes.
| Banbridge Junction Railway Act 1853 (repealed) | 16 & 17 Vict. c. ccviii | 20 August 1853 |
An Act for making a Railway from Banbridge to join the Dublin and Belfast Junction Railway at Scarvagh. (Repealed by Banbridge Junction Railway Act 1856 (19 & 20 Vict. c. xxxiv))
| South Wales Railway (Leasing) Act 1853 (repealed) | 16 & 17 Vict. c. ccix | 20 August 1853 |
An Act for granting further Powers in reference to the leasing and selling the Undertaking of the South Wales Railway Company to the Great Western Railway Company, and authorising working Arrangements between the said Companies, and for other Purposes. (Repealed by South Wales Railway Consolidation Act 1855 (18 & 19 Vict. c. xcviii))
| South Wales Railway (Pembroke Line, &c.) Act 1853 (repealed) | 16 & 17 Vict. c. ccx | 20 August 1853 |
An Act to enable the South Wales Railway Company to extend the Pembroke Line of their Railway to Pennar Mouth, and to make a Deviation in their said Pembroke Line; and for other Purposes. (Repealed by South Wales Railway Consolidation Act 1855 (18 & 19 Vict. c. xcviii))
| Liverpool, Crosby and Southport Railway Amendment Act 1853 (repealed) | 16 & 17 Vict. c. ccxi | 20 August 1853 |
An Act to reduce and regulate the Tolls payable in respect of Traffic passing between Liverpool and certain Places on the Liverpool, Crosby, and Southport Railway, and also the Payments or Tolls payable to the Lancashire and Yorkshire and East Lancashire Railway Companies in respect of Traffic to and from the last-mentioned Railway; and for other Purposes. (Repealed by Statute Law (Repeals) Act 2013 (c. 2))
| Oxford, Worcester and Wolverhampton Railway (Branches and Extension) Act 1853 | 16 & 17 Vict. c. ccxii | 20 August 1853 |
An Act to extend the Periods limited for completing and for purchasing Lands for the Stratford-upon-Avon and Kingswinford Branches of the Oxford, Worcester, and Wolverhampton Railway, and to extend such respective Branches, to construct a Branch Railway to Stourbridge, and to authorize the raising of certain Sums of Money by Preferential Shares, and for other Purposes.
| Saint George's Harbour Act 1853 or the St. George's Harbour Act 1853 | 16 & 17 Vict. c. ccxiii | 20 August 1853 |
An Act for the Construction and Maintenance of a Harbour at Llandudno in the County of Carnarvon.
| Wellington and Severn Junction Railway Act 1853 | 16 & 17 Vict. c. ccxiv | 20 August 1853 |
An Act for making a Railway from Wellington to Coalbrookdale, and an Extension to the River Severn, all in the County of Salop; and for other Purposes.
| Westminster Improvement Association Act 1853 (repealed) | 16 & 17 Vict. c. ccxv | 20 August 1853 |
An Act for the Incorporation of the Westminster Association for improving the Dwellings of the Working Classes. (Repealed by Statute Law (Repeals) Act 2013 (c. 2))
| London and North Western Railway (Crewe and Shrewsbury Extension, &c.) Act 1853 | 16 & 17 Vict. c. ccxvi | 20 August 1853 |
An Act for enabling the London and North-western Railway Company to construct a Railway from Crewe to Shrewsbury, and other Works in connexion with their Undertaking; and for other Purposes relating thereto.
| Coleford, Monmouth, Usk and Pontypool Railway Act 1853 | 16 & 17 Vict. c. ccxvii | 20 August 1853 |
An Act for making a Railway from the Newport, Abergavenny, and Hereford Railway in the Parish of Llanvihangel Pontymoyle in the County of Monmouth to Coleford in the County of Gloucester, with a Branch to the Monmouth Gasworks; and for other Purposes.
| Warrington and Altrincham Junction Railway Act 1853 | 16 & 17 Vict. c. ccxviii | 20 August 1853 |
An Act to enable the Warrington and Altrincham Junction Railway Company to make Deviations and Branches at Warrington, and to use certain neighbouring Railways.
| South Sea Company's Arrangement Act 1853 | 16 & 17 Vict. c. ccxix | 20 August 1853 |
An Act to enable the South Sea Company to enter into Arrangements with certain Proprietors of the Company.
| Rochdale Improvement Act 1853 | 16 & 17 Vict. c. ccxx | 20 August 1853 |
An Act for the Improvement of the Town of Rochdale, and for providing a Cemetery there, and for other Purposes, and of which the Short Title is "The Rochdale Improvement Act, 1853."
| Eastern Union Railway Amendment Act 1853 (repealed) | 16 & 17 Vict. c. ccxxi | 20 August 1853 |
An Act to enable the Eastern Union Railway Company to redeem their Preference Shares; and for other Purposes. (Repealed by Great Eastern Railway Act 1862 (25 & 26 Vict. c. ccxxiii))
| Hampstead Junction Railway Act 1853 | 16 & 17 Vict. c. ccxxii | 20 August 1853 |
An Act for making a Railway from the London and North-western Railway at Willesden to the North London Railway, with a Branch to the North and South Western Junction Railway, to be called "The Hampstead Junction Railway," and for other Purposes.
| Boston, Sleaford and Midland Counties Railway Act 1853 | 16 & 17 Vict. c. ccxxiii | 20 August 1853 |
An Act for making a Railway from the Great Northern Railway at Boston in the County of Lincoln to the Great Northern Railway at Barkstone in the same County, and for other Purposes.
| Life Association of Scotland Act 1853 (repealed) | 16 & 17 Vict. c. ccxxiv | 20 August 1853 |
An Act for incorporating the Life Association of Scotland, for enabling the said Association to sue and to be sued, to take and hold Property, and for other Purposes relating to the said Association. (Repealed by Life Association of Scotland Act 1964 (c. vii))
| St. Margaret and St. John the Evangelist, Westminster, Vestries Act 1853 (repealed) | 16 & 17 Vict. c. ccxxv | 20 August 1853 |
An Act for the Appointment and Regulation of Vestries in the Parishes of Saint Margaret and Saint John the Evangelist in the City of Westminster. (Repealed by London Government (City of Westminster) Order in Council 1901 (SR&O 1901/278))
| East Indian Railway Company Act 1853 (repealed) | 16 & 17 Vict. c. ccxxvi | 20 August 1853 |
An Act to amend an Act, intituled "An Act for incorporating the East Indian Railway Company, and for other Purposes connected therewith." (Note: East Indian Railway Act 1849 (12 & 13 Vict. c. xciii)) (Repealed by Statute Law (Repeals) Act 2013 (c. 2))
| Severn Valley Railway Act 1853 (repealed) | 16 & 17 Vict. c. ccxxvii | 20 August 1853 |
An Act for making a Railway from the Oxford, Worcester, and Wolverhampton Railway near Hartlebury in the County of Worcester to the Borough of Shrewsbury in the County of Salop, with a Branch, to be called "The Severn Valley Railway;" and for other Purposes. (Repealed by Severn Valley Railway Act 1855 (18 & 19 Vict. c. clxxxiii))

=== Private acts ===
| Short title | Citation | Royal assent |
Long title
| Sidney Sussex College Estate Act 1853 | 16 & 17 Vict. c. 1 Pr. | 14 June 1853 |
An Act to enable the Master, Fellows, and Scholars of Lady Frances Sidney Sussex College in the University of Cambridge to lease on long Leases and otherwise improve their Estate situate at Clee in the County of Lincoln; and for other Purposes.
| Andrew Nash's Estate Act 1853 | 16 & 17 Vict. c. 2 Pr. | 14 June 1853 |
An Act to authorize the granting of Building Leases of Lands and Hereditaments subject to the Will of Andrew John Nash Esquire, deceased.
| Aberdeen Tailors Incorporation Act 1853 | 16 & 17 Vict. c. 3 Pr. | 28 June 1853 |
An Act to incorporate the Craft of Tailors of the Burgh of Aberdeen, to confirm the Titles and Conveyances and to amend and regulate the Estates and Affairs of the said Craft, and for other Purposes relating to the Society.
| Lord and Lady Charles Pelham Clinton's Marriage Settlement Act 1853 | 16 & 17 Vict. c. 4 Pr. | 28 June 1853 |
An Act for extending the Powers of the Trustees of the Settlements on the Marriage of Charles Pelham Pelham Clinton Esquire, commonly called Lord Charles Pelham Pelham Clinton, and Elizabeth Pelham Clinton his Wife, commonly called Lady Charles Pelham Pelham Clinton, and of the Trustees of the Contract of Marriage of the Father and Mother of the said Lady Charles Pelham Pelham Clinton, so as to authorize the Investment of the Produce of certain Stocks and Shares, Part of the Trust Funds subject to the Trusts of the same Settlements and Contract of Marriage respectively, in the Purchase of Estates in England, Wales, Scotland, or Ireland, and to authorise the Investment of the same Trust Funds, or the Produce thereof, on the Security of Estates in England, Wales, Scotland, or Ireland.
| Baroness de Villar's Marriage Settlement Act 1853 | 16 & 17 Vict. c. 5 Pr. | 8 July 1853 |
An Act for enlarging the Powers of the Trustees of the Settlement made on the Marriage of the Baroness de Griffenried Villars, and for other Purposes.
| William Cotham's Estate Act 1853 | 16 & 17 Vict. c. 6 Pr. | 4 August 1853 |
An Act to authorize the granting for Building Purposes of Demises for long Terms of Years of the Trust Estate of the late William Penketh Cotham Esquire, and to authorize the granting of Mining Leases, and for other Purposes.
| Thomas Brown's Will Act 1853 | 16 & 17 Vict. c. 7 Pr. | 4 August 1853 |
An Act for enabling the Trustees of the Will of Thomas Brown Esquire, deceased, to invest the Funds subject to the Trusts of the Will of the said Thomas Brown in the Purchase of Real Estates in Ireland.
| Hall Dare's Estate Act 1853 | 16 & 17 Vict. c. 8 Pr. | 4 August 1853 |
An Act for enabling Sales, Exchanges, and Leases of the Family Estates of Robert Westley Hall Dare Esquire, and for other Purposes.
| Leigh's Estate Act 1853 | 16 & 17 Vict. c. 9 Pr. | 4 August 1853 |
An Act to authorize the granting of Building Leases of Parts of the Estates devised by the Will of Sir Robert Holt Leigh Baronet, deceased, and to extend the Power in the same Will contained to grant Mining Leases, and to authorize the Sale of a Share in the Wigan Waterworks, Part of the Estate of the said Sir Robert Holt Leigh.
| George Earl of Egremont's Estate Act 1853 | 16 & 17 Vict. c. 10 Pr. | 4 August 1853 |
An Act for confirming an Exchange between the Right Honourable Henry Stephen Earl of Ilchester and the Right Honourable George O'Brien Earl of Egremont, now deceased, and for effecting an Exchange of Lands by the last Will of the Right Honourable George Earl of Egremont, now deceased, directed to be sold, for Lands by that Will directed to be settled.
| See of Canterbury's Estate Act 1853 | 16 & 17 Vict. c. 11 Pr. | 4 August 1853 |
An Act for vesting certain Estates belonging to the See of Canterbury, now vested in Trustees for Sale, in the Archbishop of Canterbury, with Provisions for the Sale thereof, with the Approval of the Church Estates Commissioners; and for other Purposes.
| Martin's Estate Act 1853 | 16 & 17 Vict. c. 12 Pr. | 4 August 1853 |
An Act for enabling James Thomas Martin Esquire, and the Persons in remainder under the Will of Mary Jackson deceased, to grant Leases of Parts of the Estates thereby devised in Settlement, for the Purpose of building upon and otherwise improving the same; and for other Purposes.
| Bingley School and Charity Estate Act 1853 | 16 & 17 Vict. c. 13 Pr. | 15 August 1853 |
An Act for incorporating the Trustees of the Bingley Free Grammar and General Education Schools and other Charities at Bingley in the County of York; for authorizing the Sale, Exchange, or Mortgage, by the Trustees, when incorporated, of the several Estates belonging to the said Schools and Charities respectively situate in the Parishes of Bingley and Bradford, both in the said County of York; and for other Purposes relating to the said Schools and Charities.
| Clitheroe Grammar School Act 1853 | 16 & 17 Vict. c. 14 Pr. | 15 August 1853 |
An Act to amend an Act of Parliament made and passed in the First Year of the Reign of Her present Majesty Queen Victoria, intituled "An Act to enable the Governors of the Free Grammar School of Clitheroe in the County of Lancaster to sell and grant Building Leases of the School Estates, and to enlarge the Powers of the Governors;" and to authorize the Court of Chancery to apply Parts of the Proceeds of the Sales effected under such Act towards Discharge of certain Debts of the said School, and to vary the Investment of such Proceeds, and apply the Income thereof towards the Maintenance of the School; and to enlarge the Powers of granting Building Leases created by the said Act; and for other Purposes.
| Duke of Atholl's Estate Act 1853 | 16 & 17 Vict. c. 15 Pr. | 15 August 1853 |
An Act to authorize the Trustees of the late John Fourth Duke of Atholl to denude themselves of the Trusts created by his Trust Deed, and to convey the Trust Estates to his Grace George Augustus Frederick John Duke of Atholl, and the Series of Heirs specified in the said Trust Deed, and under the Provisions therein contained, and to enable the said Duke or the Heir in possession for the Time, to sell Parts of the said Estate, and other Estates, for Payment of the Debts of the said John Fourth Duke of Atholl.
| Reverend John Piddocke's Will Act 1853 | 16 & 17 Vict. c. 16 Pr. | 15 August 1853 |
An Act to enable certain Persons to grant Leases for Mining Purposes of the Estates at Oakthorpe in the Counties of Leicester and Derby, or one of them, devised by the Will of the Reverend John Piddocke Clerk, deceased.
| Jesus College, Proby Trust Act 1853 (repealed) | 16 & 17 Vict. c. 17 Pr. | 15 August 1853 |
An Act to enable the Master or Keeper, Fellows, and Scholars of Jesus College in the University of Cambridge to alter and vary the Mode of dealing with the Benefaction of Doctor Edmund Proby and Sir Thomas Proby, and to appropriate the same for the Benefit of the said College in erecting and providing Parsonage Houses for Livings belonging to the said College, and in augmenting such Livings; and for other Purposes, including the Repeal of existing Legislative Enactments relating to the said Benefiaction. (Repealed by the Charities (The Proby Trust Fund) Order 1996 (SI 1996/3220))
| Ward Jackson's Estate Act 1853 | 16 & 17 Vict. c. 18 Pr. | 15 August 1853 |
An Act to enable the Trustees of the Will of Wiliam Ward Jackson deceased to grant Mining, Building, and Improving Leases of and to open and work Mines in the Estates thereby devised upon Trusts by way of Settlement, and for other Purposes, and of which the Short Title is "Ward Jackson's Estate Act, 1853."
| Pauncefort Duncombe's Estate Act 1853 | 16 & 17 Vict. c. 19 Pr. | 15 August 1853 |
An Act for enabling Leases, Sales, and Exchanges to be made of the Estates of the late Philip Duncombe Pauncefort Duncombe Esq., deceased, and for other Purposes.
| Warden Sergison's Estate Act 1853 | 16 & 17 Vict. c. 20 Pr. | 15 August 1853 |
An Act authorizing and enabling the Trustees under the Will of the late Warden Sergison Esquire to raise Money by Mortgage of Part of the Estates settled by his Will, for the Purchase of adjoining Property, and for obtaining Enfranchisement of Copyhold Lands comprised in the Will, and for enabling the Trustees to obtain and grant Enfranchisement of Copyhold Lands, and to grant Building Leases of Parts of the settled Lands, and for other Purposes.
| Sunderland Orphan Asylum Act 1853 | 16 & 17 Vict. c. 21 Pr. | 15 August 1853 |
An Act to enable the Bishop of Durham and the Freemen and Stallingers of the Borough of Sunderland to give up their respective Interests in certain Lands and Monies, for the Purpose of endowing an Orphan Asylum at Sunderland, and of making better Provision for the Spiritual Wants of the Parish of Sunderland; and to enable such Asylum to acquire and hold additional Land; and to enlarge the Powers and to provide for the better Regulation and Management of the said Asylum; and for other Purposes.
| Marquess of Bute's Estate Act 1853 | 16 & 17 Vict. c. 22 Pr. | 15 August 1853 |
An Act to authorise the Executors in Trust of the Residuary Personal Estate bequeathed by the Will of The Most Honourable John Crichton Stuart Marquess of Bute and Earl of Dumfries, deceased, to postpone the Sale of certain Parts of such Residuary Estate, and to indemnify such Executors in respect of such Postponement; and for other Purposes.
| Henry Smith's Charity Estate Act 1853 | 16 & 17 Vict. c. 23 Pr. | 15 August 1853 |
An Act to enable the Trustees of the Estate of Henry Smith Esquire, deceased, to apply certain Funds held upon Trusts for the Relief of his poor Kindred in the Purchase of a Plot of Ground and Buildings called Strong's Place in the Parish of Kensington in the County of Middlesex.
| John Pidgley's Will Act 1853 | 16 & 17 Vict. c. 24 Pr. | 15 August 1853 |
An Act for authorizing the granting of Building Leases of Lands held under the Will of John Pidgley otherwise John Moor Pidgley, situate at Dawlish in the County of Devon.
| Treffry's Estate Act 1853 | 16 & 17 Vict. c. 25 Pr. | 15 August 1853 |
An Act for better enabling the Trusts of the Will of Joseph Thomas Treffry deceased to be executed, under the Authority of the High Court of Chancery, and for other Purposes, and of which the Short Title is "Treffry's Estate Act, 1853."
| Baron Vivian's Estate Act 1853 | 16 & 17 Vict. c. 26 Pr. | 20 August 1853 |
An Act to settle Estates in the Counties of Cornwall and Devon devised by the Will of the late Right Honourable Richard Sussex Baron Vivian deceased, dated the Twenty-fourth Day of September One thousand eight hundred and forty-one, and thereby directed to be settled, and to enable the Trustees of such settled Estates to carry into effect an Agreement to grant a Building Lease of Port of such devised Estates to the West Cornwall Railway Company; and for other Purposes.
| Pemberton's Estate Act 1853 | 16 & 17 Vict. c. 27 Pr. | 20 August 1853 |
An Act for enabling the Trustees of certain Estates in Carmarthenshire devised by the Will of Francis Charles James Pemberton Esquire, deceased, to grant Mining and Building Lenses of Parts of the said Estates; and for other Purposes.
| Chaytor's Estate Act 1853 | 16 & 17 Vict. c. 28 Pr. | 20 August 1853 |
An Act for raising by Sale or Mortgage of the Real Estates devised by the Will of Sir William Claytor Baronet, deceased, Monies for Payment of his Debts and Legacies, in aid of his Personal Estate, and for other Purposes, and of which the Short Title is "Chaytor's Estate Act, 1853."
| Duke of Cleveland's Harte Estate Act 1853 | 16 & 17 Vict. c. 29 Pr. | 20 August 1853 |
An Act to extend the Powers of the Trustees of the Will of the late Duke of Cleveland, and to enable such Trustees to raise certain Monies on certain of the Trust Estates in the County of Durham by the said Will devised.
| Rooker's Disabilities Removal Act 1853 (Note: This act was not printed by the Queen's Printer.) | 16 & 17 Vict. c. 30 Pr. | 14 June 1853 |
An Act to enable William Yates Rooker, Clerk, to exercise his Office of a Priest, and to hold any Benefice or Preferment in the United Church of England and Ireland.
| Drummond's (Duke de Melfort's) Restitution Act 1853 | 16 & 17 Vict. c. 31 Pr. | 28 June 1853 |
An Act for the Restitution in Blood of George Drummond, (Note: George Drummond, 5th Earl of Perth.) Esquire, Duke de Melfort and Comte de Lussan in France, and to relieve the said George Drummond and the Heirs Male of James First Earl of Perth from the effect of the Attainder of James Drummond, (Note: James Drummond, 2nd Duke of Perth.) commonly called Lord Drummond, eldest Son of James Fourth Earl of Perth, (Note: James Drummond, 4th Earl of Perth.) and from the effect of the Attainder of John Drummond, (Note: John Drummond, 4th Duke of Perth.) second Son of the said James Drummond, and from the effect of a Decreet of Forfaulture pronounced by the Parliament of Scotland against John Earl of Melfort. (Note: John Drummond, 1st Earl of Melfort.)
| Cutbill's Divorce Act 1853 | 16 & 17 Vict. c. 32 Pr. | 8 July 1853 |
An Act to dissolve the Marriage of Alfred Richard Cutbill with Elizabeth his now Wife, and to enable him to marry again, and for other purposes therein mentioned.
| Fisher's Divorce Act 1853 | 16 & 17 Vict. c. 33 Pr. | 8 July 1853 |
An Act to dissolve the Marriage of George Fisher, Esquire, with Mary Matilda Fisher his now Wife, and to enable him to marry again, and for other purposes therein mentioned.
| Crowe's Disabilities Removal Act 1853 | 16 & 17 Vict. c. 34 Pr. | 4 August 1853 |
An Act to enable Charles Crowe, Clerk, to exercise his Office of a Priest, and to hold any Benefice or Preferment in the United Church of England and Ireland.
| Rushbrooke's Divorce Act 1853 | 16 & 17 Vict. c. 35 Pr. | 20 August 1853 |
An Act to dissolve the Marriage of Robert Frederick Brown low Ruskbrooke with Albinia Maria his now Wife, and to enable him to marry again, and for other purposes.

=== Sources ===
- The Statutes of the United Kingdom of Great Britain and Ireland. Vol. 23: The Acts 15 & 16 Victoria (1852) and 16 & 17 Victoria (1853). London: Eyre and Spottiswoode. 1853. pp. 305–952 – via Google Books.
- The Statutes of the United Kingdom of Great Britain and Ireland, 16 & 17 Victoria. 1853. 1853 – via Internet Archive.

== See also ==
- List of acts of the Parliament of the United Kingdom
