= Customs Tariff Act 1853 =

Act of the Parliament of the United Kingdom

Customs Tariff Act 1853 (Note: Section 8.)
- Act of Parliament
- Parliament of the United Kingdom
- Long title: An Act for consolidating Customs Duties Acts.
- Citation: 16 & 17 Vict. c. 106
- Territorial extent: United Kingdom; Isle of Man; (Note: Sections 4–6.)

Dates
- Royal assent: 20 August 1853
- Commencement: 20 August 1853
- Repealed: 14 August 1855

Other legislation
- Repealed by: Customs Tariff Act 1855
- Relates to: Customs Consolidation Act 1853

Status: Repealed

Text of statute as originally enacted

The Customs Tariff Act 1853 (16 & 17 Vict. c. 106) was an act of the Parliament of the United Kingdom that consolidated the duties of customs payable in the United Kingdom and the Isle of Man.

== Subsequent developments ==
The whole act was repealed by section 8 of the Customs Tariff Act 1855 (18 & 19 Vict. c. 97), which came into force on 14 August 1855.
