= Customs Tariff Act 1855 =

Act of the Parliament of the United Kingdom

Customs Tariff Act 1855 (Note: Section X.)
- Act of Parliament
- Parliament of the United Kingdom
- Long title: An Act for the Amendment and Consolidation of the Customs Tariff Acts.
- Citation: 18 & 19 Vict. c. 97
- Territorial extent: United Kingdom

Dates
- Royal assent: 14 August 1855
- Commencement: 14 August 1855 (Note: The Acts of Parliament (Commencement) Act 1793.)
- Repealed: 24 July 1876
Other legislation
Repeals/revokes	See § Repealed enactments
Repealed by	Customs Consolidation Act 1876

Status: Repealed

Text of statute as originally enacted

The Customs Tariff Act 1855 (18 & 19 Vict. c. 97) was an act of the Parliament of the United Kingdom that consolidated enactments related to customs tariffs in the United Kingdom.

== Provisions ==
=== Repealed enactments ===
Section 8 of the act repealed 6 enactments, listed in that section.

Citation	Short title	Description	Extent of repeal
16 & 17 Vict. c. 106	Customs Tariff Act 1853	The Customs Tariff Act, 1853.	The whole act.
17 & 18 Vict. c. 28	Customs Act 1854	The Act of the Seventeenth and Eighteenth Years of Her present Majesty, Chapter Twenty-eight.	The whole act.
17 & 18 Vict. c. 29	Customs (No. 2) Act 1854	The Act of the Seventeenth and Eighteenth Years of Her present Majesty, Chapter Twenty-nine.	The whole act.
17 & 18 Vict. c. 122	Customs Act 1854	The Act of the Seventeenth and Eighteenth Years of Her present Majesty, Chapter One hundred and twenty-two.	Sections 1 and 5.
18 & 19 Vict. c. 9	Tea Duties Decline Suspension Act 1855	The Acts of the Eighteenth Year of Her said Majesty, Chapters Nine.	The whole act.
18 & 19 Vict. c. 21	Customs Duties Act 1855	The Acts of the Eighteenth Year of Her said Majesty, Chapter Twenty-one.	The whole act.

== Subsequent developments ==
The whole act was repealed by section 288 of, and schedule (A.) to, the Customs Consolidation Act 1876 (39 & 40 Vict. c. 36), which came into operation on 24 July 1876.
